The following is a list of palaces by country.

Afghanistan 
 Darul Aman Palace, Kabul – the country's most famous palace.
 Tajbeg Palace – inaccurately known as the Queen's Palace in English
 Arg Presidential Palace – Home of the president of Afghanistan

Albania 
 Presidenca – official residential palace of the president of Albania.

Armenia

Urartu and Satrapy of Armenia 

Erebuni Palace-Fortress
Haykaberd
Van Fortress

Kingdom of Armenia (antiquity)

Temple of Garni-Served as the Summer Palace of Khosrovidukht (sister of Tiridates III of Armenia)

Bagratid Armenia
Kamsarakan Palace in Ani
Tigran Honents (Merchants) Palace
Dashtadem Palace
Amberd Castle Palace

Armenian Kingdom of Cilicia

Korikos Castle Palace
Lampron Castle Palace-Ancestral home of the Armenian Hethumid princes.
Levonkla Castle Palace
Mamure Castle Palace

Armenian Melikdoms

Melik Haykaz Palace (Melikashen)
Melik Ahnazar Palace (Khnatsakh)
Melik Kasu Palace
Melik Yegan Palace (Togh)
Lekh Castle Palace
Melik-Barkhudaryan Palace (Tegh)

Iranian Armenia

Sardar’s Palace
Melik-Aghamalyan's Palace (Kond)
Sardari Berd

Republic of Armenia

Presidential Palace of Armenia-Official residence of the president of Armenia

Australia 
 Government House, Canberra – official residence of the Queen of Australia.  Full-time residence of the Governor General of Australia.
 Government House, Sydney – official residence of the governor of New South Wales, the state's representative to the Queen of Australia.
 Government House, Adelaide – official residence of the governor of South Australia, the state's representative to the Queen of Australia.
 Government House, Brisbane – official residence of the governor of Queensland, the state's representative to the Queen of Australia.
 Government House, Melbourne – official residence of the governor of Victoria, the state's representative to the Queen of Australia.
 Government House, Hobart – official residence of the governor of Tasmania, the state's representative to the Queen of Australia.
 Government House, Perth – official residence of the governor of Western Australia, the state's representative to the Queen of Australia.
 Government House, Darwin – official residence of the administrator of the Northern Territory, the territories representative to the Queen of Australia.
 Admiralty House – official Sydney residence of the governor general of Australia.
 The Lodge – official residence of the prime minister of Australia
 Kirribilli House – official Sydney residence of the prime minister of Australia.

Austria 
 Schloss Ambras, Innsbruck – residence of Archduke Ferdinand II, from 1563 to 1595
 Alte Residenz, Salzburg – former palace of the Prince-Archbishops of Salzburg
 Belvedere Palace – former summer residence of Prince Eugene of Savoy, Vienna
 Hofburg Palace – seat of Federal President, formerly the Imperial residence, Vienna
 Schönbrunn Palace – former imperial summer residence of the Habsburg Monarchs, Vienna
 For city palaces in Vienna (Palais), see :Category:Palaces in Vienna

Azerbaijan 
In Azerbaijani Turkic language have different means of the word "house" and "palace". Usually, church-houses were custom during 2nd century BC – 7th century AD. Mulk is a foreign word which came from Arabia during Caliphate Era. The word "Saray" is a castle, or government building which was considered to have particular administrative importance in various parts of the former Safavid Empire. Imarat or Igamatgah are big house which belong to rich people, khans, shahs. Same type buildings were popular in Midia, Afshar Empire, Karabakh Khanate, Baku Khanate, Shaddadids etc. Now, the term "Villa" is very popular and modern in Azerbaijan since the 1990s for a capitalist system.

Baku

Old Era (BC 100–799):
 Residence of Zagulba – Full-time residence of the president of Azerbaijan.

Shirvanshahs Era (799–1539):
 Bika Khanum Saray
 Tamar Malayka Palace – consist of two saray: Alchichak and Naslijahan Khanum

Khanates of the Caucasus:
 Baku Khans' Palace – is a complex of several houses belonged to members of ruling family of Baku Khanate.
 Muhammadkhuba Khan Palace – former royal residence of Baku khans'

19th–21st centuries:
 Presidential Palace – official residence of the president of Azerbaijan.
 Villa Petrolea – built by the Petroleum Production Company Nobel Brothers
 Asena Palace – Full-time residence of the president of Azerbaijan.
 Palace of Happiness
 Palace of De Boure
 Ghazan Khan Palace – Residence of the president of Azerbaijan in Mərdəkan.
 Gulustan Palace
 Atlas Palace
 House of Sadykhov brothers
 Government House – is a government building housing various state ministries of Azerbaijan
 "Subh" Mer Palace
 Receipts Building
 "Tarkhan" Shaykh al-Islām Palace
 Bagh Evi
 Tagiev's Villa
 Palace of Zeynalabdin Taghiyev
 Griffin House
 Tajir Palace
 Azizbekov's Villa

Icheri Sheher
 Haji Gayib's Palace
 Imaratgah Ibrahim II Shaykhshah
 Palace of the Shirvanshahs – official and full-time residence of leaders of Shirvanshahs during XIII-XVI AD centuries
 Seyid Mirbabayev's Palace – Today is Head office of SOCAR
 Ismailiyya Palace

Karabakh
 Natavan's Summer Palace – Khankendi
 Lekh Castle – palace in Kalbajar.
 Mahammad Agha Palace – Khankendi
 Bayat Castle – Tartar District.
 Sarai Hamza Sultan – Lachin District.
 Haji Gulu's House – Shusha
 Gulustan Palace – Khankendi
 Capital Palace – Barda
 Bey Palace – Aghdam
 Presidential Palace – Khankendi
 Panahguly Palace – Khankendi
 Shahbulag Castle Palace – Aghdam.
 Agha Gahraman Mirsiyab Saray
 Natavan's Palace – Shusha
 Ibrahim Khalil Khan palace - Shusha District

Nakhchivan Autonomous Republic
 Vanand Palace – Nakhchivan
 "Goyalp" Palace of Eldiguzid Empire Atabegs – Nakhchivan.
 Hasanguly Khaganate Palace – Nakhchivan.
 Khan Imarat – Nakhchivan.
 Bullur Palace – Sharur.
 Mammadguluzadehs' Palace – Nakhchivan.
 Mehmanabad Reception House – Nakhchivan.
 Nagsh Palace – official and full-time residence of the president of Nakhchivan Autonomous Republic.

Ganja
 Javad Khan Palace
 Bulutan Presidential Palace
 Yur Khanate Palace
 Fazlali Palace – Shaddadids
 Khamsa Mer House
 Governor Palace

Goygol
 Teodor Palace
 Göy Saray (Blue) Presidential Autumn Palace – Goygol – the country's most famous presidential palace.

Shamakhi
 Vahdat Presidential Summer Palace
 "Mazyad" Administrator's Palace

Shaki
 Palace of Shaki Khans
 Shakikhanovs' House
 Amirane Palace
 "Yagut" Governor Palace
 Pari Khatun's Igamatgah – consist of two palaces – Karkuk and Revan (1533)

Shamkir
 Achaemenid Empire Palace – in Shamkir District.
 Palace of Sultanate of Shamshaddil
 Caucasian Royal Palace
 Rest Palace of Soviet Azerbaijan – for members of Political Bureau

Quba
 Khanate Building
 Jovhar Palace – is a residential palace of Mer

Elsewhere
 Aibaniz Palace – Kazakh
 Safavid Khan Palace – Lankaran
 Agha Palace – Salyan
 Javadguly Palace – Sabirabad
 Nodar Church-Palace – Oghuz
 Presidential Mountain Palace – Gabala – Rest residence of the president of Azerbaijan.
 Sultan Palace – Yevlakh

Bangladesh 

 Ahsan Manzil – former residence of the Nawab of Dhaka
 Bangabhaban – official residence of the president of Bangladesh, former viceregal house in Dhaka
 Bhawal Rajbari, Gazipur, Bangladesh
 Ghughu-danga Zamindar Bari, Dinajpur, Bangladesh
 Moyez Manzil, Faridpur, Bangladesh
 Rani Bhabani's Palace
 Tajhat Palace, Rangpur
 Rose Garden Palace, Dhaka, Bangladesh
 Natore Rajbari, Natore, Bangladesh
 Ruins of Sonargaon Palace, Dhaka, Bangladesh
 Dhanbari Palace, Tangail, Bangladesh
 Baliati Palace, Manikganj, Bangladesh
 Dighapatia Palace, Natore, Bangladesh
 Shoshi Lodge, Mymensingh

Belarus 
 Chreptowicz Palace in Grodno
 Halshany Castle (ruined)
 Mir Castle
 New Hrodna Castle
 Niasviž Castle
 Old Grodno Castle
 Palace in Dziedzina
 Palace in Hermanowicze
 Palace in Kosava
 Palace in Postawy
 Palace in Świack
 Pruzhany Palace
 Rumyantsev-Paskevich Residence
 Ruzhany Palace (ruined)
 Stanislawowka Palace in Grodno
 Wańkowicz Palace in Minsk

Belgium

Brussels
 Academy Palace
 Egmont Palace
 Palace of Charles of Lorraine
 Palace of the Count of Flanders
 Royal Castle of Laeken and Royal Greenhouses of Laeken
 Royal Palace of Belgium
 Stoclet Palace

Elsewhere
 Royal Palace of Antwerp (Antwerp)
 Prince-Bishops' Palace (Liège)

Benin 
 Royal Palaces of Abomey – seat of the Kings of Abomey

Bhutan 
 Lingkana Palace – royal residence of the King of Bhutan

Bolivia 
 Palacio Quemado, La Paz

Brazil 

 Paço Imperial
 Palácio Antônio Lemos
 Palácio Anchieta
 Palácio Araribóia
 Palácio Araguaia
 Palácio Arquiepiscopal
 Palácio Brocoió
 Palácio Campo das Princesas
 Palácio da Aclamação
 Palácio da Alvorada – Presidential residence in Brasilia
 Palácio da Conceição
 Palácio da Concórdia
 Palácio da Fonte Grande
 Palácio da Justiça
 Palácio da Liberdade
 Palácio da Vitória
 Palácio das Artes
 Palácio das Indústrias
 Palácio das Princesas
 Palácio de Brocoió
 Palácio de Cristal
 Palácio de Ondina
 Palácio de São Cristóvão
 Palácio do Anhangabaú
 Palácio do Buriti
 Catete Palace – former presidential residence
 Palácio do Conde dos Arcos
 Palácio do Itamaraty – Rio de Janeiro – former Ministry of External Relations
 Palácio do Itamaraty – Ministry of External Relations
 Palácio do Congresso Nacional – National Congress and House of representatives
 Palácio do Lavradio
 Palácio do Jaburu
 Palácio do Paranaguá
 Palácio do Planalto – Presidential office in Brasília
 Palácio dos Bandeirantes
 Palácio dos Leões
 Palácio dos Martírios
 Palácio Farroupilha
 Palácio Grão Pará
 Guanabara Palace
 Palácio Gustavo Capanema
 Palácio Iguaçu
 Palácio Imperial – Imperial Museum of Brazil
 Palácio Karnak
 Palácio Laranjeiras
 Palácio Lauro Sodré
 Palácio Monroe
 Palácio Piratini
 Palácio Quitandinha
 Palácio Rio Branco – Acre
 Palácio Rio Branco – Bahia
 Palácio Rio Negro – Presidential retreat in Petrópolis
 Palácio São Joaquim
 Palácio Teresa Cristina
 Tiradentes Palace

Brunei 
 Istana Darussalam – former official residence of the Sultan of Brunei.
 Istana Darul Hana – former official residence of the Sultan of Brunei.
 Istana Pantai – former official residence of the Sultan of Brunei.
 Istana Mahkota – former official residence of the Sultan of Brunei.
 Istana Majalis – former official residence of the Sultan of Brunei.
 Istana Kaca – former official residence of the Sultan of Brunei.
 Istana Mangelella – residence of the Sultan of Brunei in the Belait district.
 Istana Nurul Iman – residence of the Sultan of Brunei and world's largest residential palace.
 Istana Nurul Izzah – residence of the Sultan of Brunei.
 Istana Edinburgh – residence of the Sultan of Brunei and the state guesthouse of the government.

Bulgaria

Varna and Black Sea coast 
 Euxinograd – former royal summer residence located on the Black Sea coast, in the outskirts of Varna. The palace is currently a governmental and presidential retreat hosting cabinet meetings in the summer and offering access for tourists to several villas and hotels as well as the gardens.

 Balchik Palace - a palace in the Bulgarian Black Sea town and resort of Balchik in Southern Dobruja. It was constructed between 1926 and 1937, during the Romanian control of the region, for the needs of Queen Marie of Romania. It's a popular tourist attraction in the region and most known for its botanical gardens.

Ruse 

 Battenberg Palace, former royal palace built for knyaz Alexander of Battenberg. Today, it houses the Regional Historic Museum of Ruse.

Sofia 

 The former Royal Palace in Sofia, today accommodating the National Art Gallery and National Ethnographic Museum. The palace was built during the rule of Alexander of Battenberg. It was later expanded and used by Ferdinand I as his official residence. During the rule of Boris III, it served mainly for representative purposes, as the official residence of the Royal Family was in Vrana. 
Vrana Palace – former official residence of the Bulgarian Royal Family in the outskirts of Sofia. Today, it's the official residence of former Tsar Simeon II of Bulgaria and Tsaritsa Margarita. The palace gardens are open for the general public on the weekends. 
 Boyana - serves as the official residence of the Bulgarian President, Vice President and Prime Minister. The former palace, which served as the primary residence for Bulgarian communist leader Todor Zhivkov, now houses the National Historical Museum of Bulgaria.
 Sarmadzhiev House - located in central Sofia, it serves as the official residence of the Turkish Ambassador to Bulgaria.  
 British House - a palace in the centre of Sofia, serves as the official residence for the British Ambassador to Bulgaria. It was used by Prince Charles during his visits in 1998 and in 2003.
 Kuyumdzhiev House - built for the prominent Bulgarian businessman Angel Kuyumdzhiev, it serves as the official residence of the French Ambassador to Bulgaria.

Other Historic Palaces 
The following are historic strongholds throughout the years in the different capitals of Bulgaria. They often housed the royal and patriarchal palaces and are enclosed in defensive walls around their perimeter. 
Tsarevets Fortress - royal stronghold that houses the royal and patriarchal palaces of the Second Bulgarian Empire (1185-1393).
Belogradchik Fortress - ancient fortress constructed during the time the region was part of the Roman Empire.
Asen's Fortress - medieval fortress in the Bulgarian Rhodope Mountains.
Baba Vida Fortress - medieval fortress in Vidin in northwestern Bulgaria. It briefly served as the capital of the Second Bulgarian Empire before it was seized by the Ottoman Empire in 1396.
Palace of Omurtag - site of the former royal palace of Omurtag of Bulgaria, ruler (kanasubigi) of the First Bulgarian Empire (815-831) in northeastern Bulgaria.
Urvich - a medieval fortress in present-day Pancharevo, about 20 km from Sofia, built during the Second Bulgarian Empire by Emperor Ivan Shishman of Bulgaria.

Other Royal Palaces 
These are mostly hunting lodges and retreats for the Bulgarian Royal Family, located in the Rila Mountain range. 
Tsarska Bistritsa - a former royal palace in the Rila Mountain range.
Saragyol - a royal residence in the Rila Mountains.
Sitnyakovo - a royal residence in the Rila Mountains.

Burundi 
 Ibwami – former royal palace, Gitega

Cambodia 

 Royal Palace, Phnom Penh – residence of the King of Cambodia, Phnom Penh
 The Royal Residence – residence of the Royal Family of Cambodia, Siem Reap
 Ancient Palace, Phimeanakas – Ancient Palace, Siem Reap

Canada 

 Rideau Hall – residence of the Canadian Monarch, occupied predominantly by vice-regal Governor General
 Citadelle of Quebec
 Casa Loma – Home of Sir Henry Mill Pellatt.

Residences of provincial Lieutenant-Governors:
 Government House (British Columbia)
 Government House (Manitoba)
 Government House (Newfoundland and Labrador)
 Government House (Nova Scotia)
 Government House (Prince Edward Island)
 Government House (Saskatchewan)
 Old Government House, New Brunswick

Chile 
 Palacio de Cerro Castillo
 Palacio de La Moneda
 Palacio de las Majadas de Pirque

China 

The English word "palace" is used to translated the Chinese word 宮 (pronounced "gōng" in Mandarin). This character represents two rooms connected (呂), under a roof (宀). Originally the character applied to any residence or mansion, but starting with the Qin dynasty (3rd century BC) it was used only for the residence of the emperor and members of the imperial family. Chinese palaces are different from post-Renaissance European palaces in the sense that they are not made up of one building only (however big and convoluted the building may be), but are in fact huge spaces surrounded by a wall and containing large separated halls (殿 diàn) for ceremonies and official business, as well as smaller buildings, galleries, courtyards, gardens, and outbuildings, more like the Roman or Carolingian palatium.

The world's largest palace to have ever existed, the Weiyang Palace, was built in the Han dynasty. The world's largest palace currently still in existence, the Forbidden City, was constructed in the Ming dynasty.

List of Chinese imperial palaces, in chronological order 
This is an incomplete list of Chinese palaces.

 Xianyang Palace (咸陽宮), in (Qin) Xianyang (咸陽), now 15 km/9 miles east of modern Xianyang, Shaanxi province: this was the royal palace of the state of Qin before the Chinese unification, and then the palace of the First Emperor when China was unified.
 Epang Palace (阿房宮 – probable meaning: "The Palace on the Hill"), 20 km/12 miles south of (Qin) Xianyang (咸陽), now 15 km/9 miles west of Xi'an (西安), Shaanxi province: the fabulous imperial palace built by the First Emperor in replacement of Xianyang Palace.
 Weiyang Palace (未央宮 – "The Endless Palace"), in (Han) Chang'an (長安), now 7 km/4 miles northeast of downtown Xi'an (西安), Shaanxi province: imperial palace of the prestigious Western Han dynasty for two centuries. This is the largest palace ever built on Earth, covering 4.8 km2 (1,200 acres), which is 6.7 times the size of the Forbidden City, or 11 times the size of the Vatican City.
 Southern Palace (南宮) and Northern Palace (北宮), in Luoyang (洛陽), Henan province: imperial palaces of the Eastern Han Dynasty for two centuries, the Southern Palace being used for court hearings and audiences,  Northern Palace being the private residence of the emperor and his concubines.
 Taiji Palace (太極宮 – "Palace of the Supreme Ultimate"), also known as the Western Apartments (西内), in (Tang) Chang'an (長安), now downtown Xi'an (西安), Shaanxi province: imperial palace during the Sui dynasty (who called it Daxing Palace – 大興宮, "Palace of Great Prosperity") and in the beginning of the Tang dynasty (until A.D. 663). Area: 4.2 km2 (1,040 acres), imperial section proper: 1.92 km2 (474 acres).
 Daming Palace (大明宮 – "Palace of Great Brightness"), also known as the Eastern Apartments (東内), in (Tang) Chang'an (長安), now downtown Xi'an (西安), Shaanxi province: imperial palace of the Tang dynasty after A.D. 663 (it was briefly named Penglai Palace (蓬萊宮) between 663 and 705), but the prestigious Taiji Palace remained used for major state ceremonies such as coronations. Area: 3.11 km2 (768 acres), almost 4.5 times the size of the Forbidden City.
 Kaifeng Imperial Palace (東京大内皇宮), in Dongjing (東京), now called Kaifeng (開封), Henan province: imperial palace of the Northern Song dynasty.
 Hangzhou Imperial Palace (臨安大内禁宮), in Lin'an (臨安), now called Hangzhou (杭州), Zhejiang province: imperial palace of the Southern Song dynasty.
 Karakorum (哈拉和林), site of the imperial palace of the Mongol Empire.
 Shangdu (元上都) and Khanbaliq (元大都), locations of the imperial palaces of the Yuan dynasty.
 Ming Imperial Palace (明故宮), in Nanjing (南京), Jiangsu province: imperial palace of the Ming dynasty until 1421.

 Forbidden City (紫禁城), now known in China as Beijing's Old Palace (北京故宫), in Jingshi (京師), now called Beijing (北京): imperial palace of the Ming dynasty and Qing dynasty from 1421 until 1924. Area: 720,000 m2 (178 acres). The Forbidden City is the world's largest palace currently in existence.

Apart from the main imperial palace, Chinese dynasties also had several other imperial palaces in the capital city where the empress, crown prince, or other members of the imperial family dwelled. There also existed palaces outside of the capital city called "away palaces" (離宮) where the emperors resided when traveling. The habit also developed of building garden estates in the countryside surrounding the capital city, where the emperors retired at times to get away from the rigid etiquette of the imperial palace, or simply to escape from the summer heat inside their capital. This practice reached a zenith with the Qing dynasty, whose emperors built the fabulous Imperial Gardens (御園), now known in China as the Gardens of Perfect Brightness (圓明園), and better known in English as the Old Summer Palace. The emperors of the Qing Dynasty resided and worked in the Imperial Gardens, 8 km/5 miles outside of the walls of Beijing, the Forbidden City inside Beijing being used only for formal ceremonies.

These gardens were made up of three gardens: the Garden of Perfect Brightness proper, the Garden of Eternal Spring (長春園), and the Elegant Spring Garden (綺春園); they covered a huge area of 3.5 km2 (865 acres), almost 5 times the size of the Forbidden City, and 8 times the size of the Vatican City.  comprising hundreds of halls, pavilions, temples, galleries, gardens, lakes, etc. Several famous landscapes of southern China had been reproduced in the Imperial Gardens, hundreds of invaluable Chinese art masterpieces and antiquities were stored in the halls, making the Imperial Gardens one of the largest museum in the world. Some unique copies of literary work and compilations were also stored inside the Imperial Gardens. In 1860, during the Second Opium War, the British and French expeditionary forces looted the Old Summer Palace. Then on October 18, 1860, in order to "punish" the imperial court, which had refused to allow Western embassies inside Beijing, the British general Lord Elgin – with protestations from the French – purposely ordered to set fire to the huge complex which burned to the ground. It took 3500 British troops to set the entire place ablaze and took three whole days to burn. The burning of the Gardens of Perfect Brightness is still a very sensitive issue in China today.

Following this cultural catastrophe, the imperial court was forced to relocate to the old and austere Forbidden City where it stayed until 1924, when the Last Emperor was expelled by a republican army. Empress dowager Cixi (慈禧太后) built the Summer Palace (頤和園 – "The Garden of Nurtured Harmony") near the Old Summer Palace, but on a much smaller scale than the Old Summer Palace. There are currently some projects in China to rebuild the Imperial Gardens, but this appears as a colossal undertaking, and no rebuilding has started yet.

Other palaces 
Some other palaces include:
 Summer Palace in Beijing
 Mukden Palace in Shenyang
 Chengde Mountain Resort at Chengde
 Potala Palace in Lhasa – Main residence of the Dalai Lama
 Norbulingka Palace in Lhasa – Summer palace of the Dalai Lama
 Spring Fragrance Palace in Fujian

Colombia 
 Palacio de Nariño
 Palacio Lievano
 Palacio de San Francisco

Croatia 
 Diocletian's Palace

Czech Republic

Prague
 Archbishop's Palace (Prague)
 Belvedere (Prague)
 Czernin Palace (Prague)
 Clam-Gallas Palace (Prague)
 Kaunitz Palace (Prague)
 Kinsky Palace (Prague) – former residence of the Kinsky princely family
 Kolowrat Palace (Prague, Hradcanske namesti)
 Kolowrat Palace (Prague, Loretanska)
 Kolowrat Palace (Prague, Ovocny trh)
 Kolowrat Palace (Prague, Valdstejnska)
 Liechtenstein Palace (Prague, Kampa Island)
 Liechtenstein Palace (Prague, Malostranské náměstí)
 Lobkowicz Palace (Prague Castle)
 Lobkowicz Palace (Prague, Mala Strana)
 Martinic Palace (Prague)
 Morzin Palace (Prague)
 Old Royal Palace (Prague Castle)
 Palfy Palace (Prague)
 Prague Castle – built in a Palace style
 Rosenberg Palace (Prague)
 Salm Palace (Prague)
 Schönborn Palace (Prague)
 Sternberg Palace (Prague, Hradcany)
 Sternberg Palace (Prague, Mala Strana)
 Schwarzenberg Palace (Prague) – former residence of the Schwarzenberg princely family
 Thun Palace (Prague)
 Thun-Hohenstein Palace (Prague)
 Troja Palace (Prague)
 Tuscan Palace (Prague)
 Wallenstein Palace (Prague)

Elsewhere
 Archbishop's Palace (Kroměříž)

Denmark 

 Amalienborg Palace, winter palace of the Danish royal family, Copenhagen
 Christiansborg Palace, Copenhagen
 Fredensborg Palace, spring and autumn residence of the Danish monarch, Fredensborg
 Frederiksberg Palace, Frederiksberg municipality in Copenhagen City
 Frederiksborg Palace, Hillerød
 Gråsten Palace, summer residence of the Danish royal family, Gråsten
 Kastellet, Copenhagen
 Rosenborg Castle, Copenhagen
 Charlottenlund Palace, Copenhagen
 Kronborg Castle, Elsinore (at which Shakespeares "Hamlet" takes place)

Egypt

Pharaonic 
 16th century BC Unknown king palace, Ballas
 14th century BC Palace of Amenhotep III in Malkata (or Malqata) in Luxor
 1346 BC Amarna palaces of Pharaoh Akhenaten, in al-Minya
 14th century BC Amenhotep III palace at Avaris (Pi-Ramesses), in Eastern desert
 13th century BC Palace of the Pharaoh Merenptah in Memphis, Egypt
 13th century BC Palace of Rameses II, Ramesseum, Luxor
 13th century BC Palace of Rameses II, Fayoum
 1175 BC The Temple & Palace of Rameses III at Medinet Habu, Egypt
 6th century BC Palace of Wahibre (Apries) in Memphis, Egypt

Ptolemaic 
 Circa 2nd century BC The Ptolemaic palace in what is now Silsila district in Alexandria
 50s BC Caesareum palace which was built by Cleopatra in honor of Julius Caesar or Mark Antony in Alexandria
 50s BC Antirrhodus island palace, was erected off of Alexandria's mainland in the Eastern Harbour (later submerged by the sea)

Roman 
 100 AD Roman palace at El Haiz area in the Bahariya Oasis, western desert.

Arab-Islamic 
 870 AD Ahmad ibn Tulun Palace at al-Qatta'i in Old Cairo
12th-13th centuries and after: palaces built within the Citadel of Cairo
 13th century Sultan al-Salih palace on Rhoda Island in Cairo
 1293 Amir Alin Aq Palace at Bab al-Wazir Street, Tabbana Quarter, Cairo
 14th century Palace of Manjak al Yusufi al Silahdar, Cairo
1313 Ablaq Palace built by Al-Nasir Muhammad in the Citadel of Cairo
Other associated structures built nearby include the Great Iwan
 1330 Amir Qawsun Palace (Qawsoun Yashbak min Mahdi) in Cairo
 1334 Beshtak Palace
 1352 Amir Taz Palace in Cairo
 1366 Palace of Emir Tashtimur (Hummus Akhdar) in Cairo
 15th century Palace of al-Ghuri, Cairo
 1496 Amir Mamay Palace (Bait al-Qady), Cairo
 16th century Bayt Al-Razzaz palace or Palace of al-Ashraf Qaytbay, Darb Al-Ahmar, Cairo
 1634 House of Gamal al-Din al-Dhahabi, Cairo
17th century and after: Bayt Al-Suhaymi, Cairo
 18th century Qasr al-Aini (converted to Cairo University hospital)
 1731 Harawi Residence
 1779 Al Musafir Khana Palace (Kasr El Chok), at al-Jamaliyya, Old Cairo. Birthplace of Khedive Ismail. It was destroyed by fire in 1998
 1790s Mohammed Bey al-Alfi Palace (where Napoleon lived during his Egyptian campaign).
 1794 Bayt al-Sinnari (Palace). Now a museum.

Modern Egypt 
 19th century Bulaq palace of Ismail Pasha in Giza
 19th century Mena House built by Khedive Ismail, at Giza near pyramids
 19th century Kasr al-Nozha, the Cattaui (Egyptian Jewish industrialist) palace in Shubra
 19th century Kasr al-Incha (now the ministry of defense)
 19th century Kasr Kamal al-Din (former residence of the ministry of foreign affairs)
 19th century Zaafarana palace (now the Ain Shams University administration building)
 19th century Medhat Yegen Pasha's palace, Garden City, Cairo. (Demolished)
 19th century Mahmoud Sami el-Baroudi palace in Giza now demolished
 19th century Kasr al-Aali
 19th century Kasr al-Mounira that became the French archeological center (IFAO).
 19th century Kasr al-Amira Iffet Hassan that was later purchased by Princess Shuvekar Ibrahim before becoming the official seat of the council of ministers.
 19th century El-Walda Pasha palace (now demolished).
 1807 Muhammad Ali's Shubra Palace (Ain Shams faculty of agriculture)
 1827 Harem Palaces at the Citadel of Cairo (now the Military museum)
 1850s Kasr al-Ismailia, Cairo (now demolished, it was in the area of the Mogama El-Tahrir government complex)
 1860s Khairy Pasha Palace, Cairo (became the campus of the American University in Cairo in the 1920s)
 1814 Al-Gawhara Palace at Cairo citadel
 1854 Qasr al-Nil (now demolished but the area in downtown Cairo still carries its name)
 1863 Gezirah Palace (now a private hotel)
 1863 Abdeen Palace, Cairo (former royal residence)
 1897 Count Gabriel Habib El-Sakakini Pasha Palace, Cairo
 1898 Anisa Wissa Palace, Fayoum.
 1899 Prince Mohammed Ali Tewfik palace (now the Manyal Palace museum)
 1899 Prince Said Halim Pasha Palace in downtown Cairo
 late 19th century Koubbeh Palace, El-Quba
 20th century Fouad Serageddin Pasha's palace, Garden City
 20th century EL-Dobara palace (now a government school)
 20th century Tahra Palace, El-Zayton, Cairo
 20th century Sultana Malak Palace, Heliopolis, Cairo
 1901 Palace of Saad Zaghloul Pasha (Beit El-Omma Museum)
 1911 Baron Empain Palace, Heliopolis, Cairo
 1910 Heliopolis Palace, Heliopolis, Cairo
 1915 Mohammed Mahmoud Khalil palace (now a museum)
 1921 Prince Amr Ibrahim Palace, Zamalek (now the Museum of Islamic Ceramics)
 1924 Kurmet Ibn Hani' (Ahmed Shawki museum)
 Unknown (before 1939) Prince Yousef Kamal Palace at Ain Shams district, now the Desert research institute
 Montaza Palace, Alexandria
 Ras Al-Teen Palace, Alexandria

Estonia 
 Kadriorg Palace of Peter the Great in Tallinn
 Toompea Palace of the governor of Reval Governorate in Tallinn

Ethiopia 
 Jubilee Palace (National Palace) – seat of the president, former imperial palace

Finland 
 Turku Castle, the only castle in Finland where there was for some time in the 16th century a real royal court.
 Presidential Palace

France

Paris 
 Conciergerie, site of the first royal palace, now part of the Palais de Justice
 Grand Palais, site of the Universal Exposition of 1900
 Hôtel de Matignon, official residence of the Prime Minister
 Hôtel de Sully
 Hôtel Lambert
 Palais Bourbon, home of the French National Assembly
 Palais Brongniart, location of the Paris Bourse (stock exchange)
 Palais de l'Elysée, presidential palace of France from 1848 to 1852, 1874–1940, and then from 1946 until now
 Palais de la Cité, also simply known as le Palais, first royal palace of France, from before 1000 until 1363; now the seat of the courts of justice of Paris and of the Court of Cassation (the supreme court of France)
 Palais de la Légion d'honneur
 Palais du Louvre, second royal palace of France, from 1364 until 1789; now the Louvre Museum
 Palais du Luxembourg, home of the French Senate
 Palais Royal, originally the home of Richelieu, it became a royal palace when the young King Louis XIV, his mother Anne of Austria, and Mazarin moved in; later belonged to the dukes of Orléans; now the seat of the Conseil d'État and of the Ministry of Culture
 Palais des Tuileries, third royal/imperial palace of France, 1789–1792, 1804–1848, 1852–1870, destroyed in 1871
 Petit Palais, home of the Paris Museum of Fine Arts (Musée de Beaux Arts)

Versailles 

 Château de Versailles, former main residence of the French royal family
 Grand Trianon
 Petit Trianon

Île-de-France 

 Château de Bagatelle, Neuilly-sur-Seine
 Château de Chantilly, Chantilly
 Château de Compiègne
 Château d'Écouen, Écouen
 Château de Fontainebleau, former royal residence in Fontainebleau
 Château de La Roche-Guyon, La Roche-Guyon
 Château de Maisons-Laffitte
 Château de Rambouillet, presidential summer residence in Rambouillet
 Château de Saint-Cloud
 Château de Saint-Germain-en-Laye
 Château de Sceaux
 Château de Vaux-le-Vicomte
 Château de Vincennes

Elsewhere 
 Château d'Amboise
 Château d'Anet
 Château d'Angers
 Château d'Azay-le-Rideau
 Château de Blois
 Château de Brézé
Château de Cayx, Cahors, a residence of the Danish Royal Family
 Château de Chambord
 Château de Châteaudun
 Château de Châteauneuf
 Château de Chantilly
 Château de Chaumont
 Château de Chenonceau
 Château de Cheverny
 Château de Commercy
 Château de Condé
 Château de Dissay
 Château d'Ételan
 Château de Lunéville
 Château de Montbéliard
 Château de la Mothe-Chandeniers
 Château de Nexon
 Château de Pierrefonds
 Château de la Rivière Bourdet
 Château de Saumur
 Château de Talcy
 Château de Valençay
 Château de Villandry
 Château de Vitré
 Château de Saumur
 Château des ducs de Savoie
 Château de Sully-sur-Loire
 Château d'Ussé
 Palais des ducs et des États de Bourgogne, Dijon (palace of the famous dukes of Burgundy)
 Palais des Papes, Avignon (palace of the popes in the Middle Ages)
 Palace of the Kings of Majorca, Perpignan
 Palais des rois de Navarre, Pau (palace of the kings of Navarre)
 Palais ducal de Nancy, Nancy (palace of the dukes of Lorraine)
 Palais ducal de Nevers, Nevers (palace of the dukes of Nevers)

Georgia 

 Dadiani Palace
 Palace of Mukhrani
 Geguti
 Romanov Palace (1892–95)
 Vicegerent Palace

Germany 

German has contrasting words for what may be considered a palace: Burg which connotes a seat that is enclosed by walls, a fastness or keep, and Schloss, a more conscious borrowing, with the usual connotations of splendour. In practice, the Schloss is more likely to be a royal or ducal palace. 
Besides, the term Palais is mostly used for noble manor houses or palatial residences.

Baden-Württemberg 

 Bruchsal Palace, Bruchsal, residence of the Prince-Bishops of Speyer
 Heidelberg Castle, Heidelberg, residence of the Electors Palatine
 Hohenzollern Castle, show castle of the kings of Prussia
 Karlsruhe Palace, Karlsruhe, residence of the Grand Dukes of Baden
 Ludwigsburg Palace, Ludwigsburg, residence of the Kings of Württemberg
 Mannheim Palace, Mannheim, residence of the Electors Palatine
 Burg Meersburg, Meersburg, residence of the Prince-Bishops of Constance
 Neues Schloss, Meersburg, residence of the Prince-Bishops of Constance
 Schwetzingen Castle, Schwetzingen, residence of the Electors Palatine
 Sigmaringen Castle, residence of the princes of Hohenzollern-Sigmaringen
 Old Castle, Stuttgart, residence of the Kings of Württemberg
 New Castle, Stuttgart, residence of the Kings of Württemberg
 Castle Solitude, Stuttgart, residence of the Kings of Württemberg

Bavaria 

 Herrenchiemsee, palace built by Ludwig II of Bavaria
 Linderhof Palace, palace built by Ludwig II of Bavaria
 Neuschwanstein, palace built by Ludwig II of Bavaria
 Ansbach Residence, Ansbach, residence of the margraves of Ansbach
 Seehof Palace, Memmelsdorf
 Alte Hofhaltung and Neue Residenz, Bamberg, residence of the prince-bishops of Bamberg
 New Castle, Bayreuth, residence of the margraves of Bayreuth
 Ehrenburg Palace, Coburg
 Ducal Palace, Coburg, residence of the dukes of Saxe-Coburg
 Nymphenburg Palace, Munich, chief summer residence of the kings of Bavaria
 Weißenstein Palace, Pommersfelden 
 Residenz, Munich, chief residence of the kings of Bavaria
 Veste Oberhaus, Passau – residence of the prince-bishops of Passau
 Ellingen Residence, Ellingen
 St. Emmeram's Abbey – seat of the princes of Thurn und Taxis, Regensburg
 Callenberg Castle, Coburg
 Würzburg Residence – seat of the prince-bishops of Würzburg
  Rosenau Palace, Coburg
 Palais Leuchtenberg – palace for the first Duke of Leuchtenberg
  Fantaisie Palace, Bayreuth
 Fortress Marienberg – seat of the prince-bishops of Würzburg
 Dachau Palace
  Haimhausen Palace
 Fürstenried Palace
  Johannisburg Palace
  Ketschendorf Palace
 King's House on Schachen
 Schloss Elmau

Berlin 

 Bellevue Palace – seat of Federal President, Berlin
 Berlin Palace – former residence of the Hohenzollern rulers
 Biesdorf Palace
 Borsig Palace 
 Britz Palace
 Charlottenburg Palace – former summer palace of the Hohenzollern, Berlin
 Ephraim Palace
 Friedrichsfelde Palace – former palace of Prussian Kings and nobles
 Glienicke Palace
 Jewel Palace
 Kommandantenhaus – firstly private palace, later seat of the garrison of Berlin
 Köpenick Palace
 Crown Prince's Palace
 Mendelssohn Palace
 Monbijou Palace, Berlin (demolished)
 Old Palace, Berlin – former residence of German Emperor William I
 Ordenspalais – palace of several Prussian Kings and nobles (demolished)
 Pannwitz Palace - completed 1914, now serving as a noble hotel
 Podewils Palace - unique Baroque palace in central Berlin 
 Palace of Prince Albrecht – former residence of Prince Albert of Prussia (demolished)
 Palace of Prince Henry – former residence of Prince Henry of Prussia
 Palais am Festungsgraben
 Palais Strousberg (demolished)
 Pfaueninsel Palace – former palace of Frederick William II of Prussia
 Prinzessinnenpalais – built for the princesses of the House of Hohenzollern
 Reich Chancellery – former seat of the chancellor of Germany (building demolished)
 Reichspräsidentenpalais - seat of the president of Germany during  the Weimar Republic (building demolished)
 Reichstagspräsidentenpalais - former seat of the president of the Reichstag (1919-1933)
 Tegel Palace
 Schönhausen Palace
 Spandau Citadel

Brandenburg 

 Belvedere on the Klausberg, Potsdam
 Belvedere on the Pfingstberg, Potsdam
  City Palace – winter residence of the  kings of Prussia and the  German emperors
 Marmorpalais, Potsdam
  Meseberg Palace, Meseberg
  Barberini Palace, Potsdam
 New Palace – former residence of the Hohenzollern rulers, Potsdam (located in the Sanssouci Park)
 Orangery Palace, Potsdam
 Babelsberg Palace, Babelsberg quarter of Potsdam
 Rheinsberg Palace
 Cecilienhof Palace, Potsdam
 Charlottenhof Palace, Potsdam
 Sanssouci Palace – former residence of King Frederick II of Prussia of Prussia, Potsdam

Hesse 

 Ducal Palace, Darmstadt, residence of the grand dukes of Hesse
 Orangery, Fulda
 Orangery, Kassel, residence of the electors of Hesse
 Philippsthal Orangery, Philippsthal
 Ducal Palace, Wiesbaden, residence of the dukes of Nassau
 Biebrich Palace, Wiesbaden
 Marburger Schloss
 Palais Thurn und Taxis, Frankfurt
 Schloss Weilburg
 Wilhelmshöhe Palace, Kassel, residence of the electors of Hesse

Lower Saxony

Mecklenburg-Vorpommern 

 Güstrow Castle, a masterpiece of Renaissance architecture
 Schloss Bothmer, near Klütz
 Schloss Kartlow
 Schloss Ludwigslust, former duke residence in Ludwigslust
 Schloss Neustrelitz, destroyed dukes palace of Neustrelitz
 Schloss Schwerin – seat of Mecklenburg-Vorpommern state parliament in its capital city, Schwerin

North Rhine-Westphalia 
 Augustusburg Palace
 Electoral Palace, Bonn, residence of the archbishop-electors of Cologne
 Drachenburg Palace
 Falkenlust Palace
 Schloss Münster
 Schloss Nordkirchen
 Palais Schaumburg, Bonn
 Schloss Benrath, Düsseldorf, residence of the electors Palatine

Rhineland-Palatinate 

 Electoral Palace, Koblenz
 Electoral Palace, Mainz
 Kurfürstliches Palais, Trier
 Stolzenfels Castle, Koblenz

Saxony

Thuringia 
 Altenburg Castle, Altenburg, residence of the dukes of Saxe-Altenburg
 Schloss Friedenstein, Gotha, residence of the dukes of Saxe-Gotha
 Schloss Elisabethenburg, Meiningen, residence of the dukes of Saxe-Meiningen
 Heidecksburg, Rudolstadt, residence of the princes of Schwarzburg-Rudolstadt
 Sondershausen Palace, Sondershausen, residence of the princes of Schwarzburg-Sondershausen
 Grand Ducal Palace, Weimar, residence of the grand dukes of Saxe-Weimar

Schleswig-Holstein 
 Plön Castle

Ghana 
 The Manhyia Palace (Asantehene's Palace) – seat of the Asantehene of Ashanti, Kumasi
 The Flagstaff House (Presidential Palace) – seat of government until the late 1970s, Accra
 The Christianborg (Osu Castle) – former seat of the government till December 2008, Accra
 The Golden Jubilee Palace (Presidential Palace) formerly known as the "Flagstaff House" – seat of Government since December 2008, Accra
The Abampredease Palace. Palace of Dormaahene

Greece 

 Achilleion (Corfu), built for Empress Elisabeth of Austria, later the summer palace for Kaiser Wilhelm II, now a museum
 Old Royal Palace
 Thessaloniki Government House, known as the "Little Palace" (Macedonia)
 Mon Repos (Museum)
 New Royal Palace (First Crown Prince's Palace; now Presidential Residence)
 Palace of Saint Michael and Saint George, in Corfu (now the Sino-Japanese Museum)
 Palace of the Grand Master of the Knights of Rhodes (built from the knight hospitaliers in the 14th century)
 Polydendri (Thessaly)
 Psychiko (Crown Prince Paul & Crown Princess Frederica)
 Queen's Tower (King Othon & Queen Amalia)
 Tatoi (Estate Outside of Athens)

Haiti 
 National Palace *demolished, 2 years after 2010 Haiti earthquake, plans to rebuild have not been set or disclosed – residence of the president of Haiti

Hungary 
 Buda Castle (Budapest) – former royal residence, now National Széchényi Library and National Gallery of Hungary
 Eszterháza (Fertőd) – palace of the House of Esterházy
 Festetics Palace (Keszthely) – palace of the Festetics Family near Lake Balaton
 Royal Castle of Gödöllő (Gödöllő) – former royal summer residence of the Hungarian Kings since 1867
 Sándor Palace (Budapest) – official residence and office of the president of the Republic of Hungary

India 

 Agra Fort – former royal residence of the Moghul, Agra
 Aina Mahal – royal residence of ruler of Kutch.
 Amber Palace (Amber Fort) – former royal residence, Jaipur
 Amba Vilas Palace–Mysore
 Antilia – residence of entrepreneur Mukesh Ambani
 Arki Palace Himachal
 Bangalore Palace – Bengaluru
 Bilara Palace (Dist Jodhpur, Rajasthan 
 Bhutan House – royal residence of the Dorji family, Kalimpong
 British Residency, Kollam – Architectural Marvel built by Col. John Munro
 Chatrapati Shahu palace – former royal residence of chatrapati shahu maharaj kolhapur
 Cheluvamba Vilas Palace-Mysore
 Chowmahalla Palace
 City Palace, Jaipur – seat of the Maharaja of Jaipur
 City Palace, Udaipur – seat of the Maharana of Udaipur
 Candra Mahal, Jaipur
 Chittor Fort, Chittorgarh – Largest Fort in India
 Cooch Behar Palace – former royal residence, Cooch Behar
 Delhi Fort – former seat of the Moghul, Delhi
 Falaknuma Palace – royal residence, Hyderabad
 Fatehpur Sikri – former royal residence of Emperor Akbar
 Gajlaxmi Palace – Palace of Singhdeo dynasty, Dhenkanal
 Gohar Mahal – former royal residence, Bhopal
 Gorbandh Palace, Jaisalmer
 Grand Palace, Srinagar – former royal residence, today hotel, Srinagar
 Hawa Mahal (Palace of Winds) – former royal residence, Jaipur
 Hazarduari Palace – former royal residence, Murshidabad
 Hill Palace, Tripunithura, Cochin – former Royal Residence of Maharaja of Cochin, now one of the largest archaeological museums in India
 Jagan Mohan Palace-Mysore
 Jag Mandir – former residence of Shah Jahan, Udaipur
 Jag Niwas (Lake Palace) – former royal residence, Udaipur
 Jai Mahal – former royal residence, today hotel, Jaipur
 Jaya Lakshmi Vilas Palace-Mysore
 Jai Vilas Palace – seat of the Maharaja of Gwalior
 Jaisalmer Fort – seat of the Maharaja of Jaisalmer
 Jhargram Palace – royal residence & heritage hotel, Jhargram
 Karanji Vilas Palace-Mysore
 Kangra Fort – seat of the Maharaja of Kangra-Lambagraon
 Kathgola – former estate of a zamindar (landowner), Murshidabad
 Khasbagh Palace – palace of the Maharaja of Rampur
 King Kothi Palace – palace of VII Nizam, Osman Ali Khan
 Kowdiar Palace – residence of the Travancore Royal Family
 Lalgarh Palace – former royal residence, today hotel, Bikaner
 Laxmi Vilas Palace – seat of the Maharajah of Baroda
 Lakshmipuram Palace - is the royal palace of the Parappanad royal families at Changanassery
 Lalitha Mahal Palace-Mysore
 Laxmi Vilas Palace (also known as Anandbagh Palace) – seat of the Maharaja of Darbhanga, donated to Kameshwar Singh Sanskrit University. Now houses office of vice-chancellor and other officials of the university.
 Lokranjan Mahal-Mysore
 Marble Palace (Kolkata) – former residence of Raja Rajendra Mullick, Kolkata
 Mattancherry Palace (Dutch Palace), Cochin – former Royal Residence of Maharaja of Cochin, archeological museum at present.
 Nashipur Rajbari – former royal residence, Murshidabad
 Narain Niwas Palace – former royal residence, today hotel, Jaipur
 Nedumpuram Palace
 New Palace – seat of Maharaja of Kolhapur
 Padmanabhapuram Palace – seat of the Maharaja of Travancore
 Prag Mahal – royal palace of rulers of Kutch
 Purani Haveli – seat of the Nizam of Hyderabad
 Rajendra vilas Palace-Mysore
 Raj Mahal Palace – former royal residence, Jaipur (today hotel)
 Rajbari – seat of the Maharaja of Cooch Behar
 Rambagh Palace – former residence of the Maharaja of Jaipur (today hotel)
 Rashtrapati Bhavan – seat of the president, former viceregal residence, Delhi
 Red Fort – seat of many dynasties of India
 Samode Palace – former royal residence, today hotel, Jaipur
 Shaniwar Wada, Pune – royal residence of Peshwas
 Shaukat Mahal – former royal residence, Bhopal
 Thanjavur Nayak – Thanjavur (Tanjore) Nayak Palace, Thanjavur
 Thevally Palace, Kollam – Outhouse of erstwhile Travancore Kings
 Umaid Bhawan Palace – seat of the Maharaja of Jodhpur
 Uparkot Fort – former seat of the Chudasama of Junagadh, Gujarat
 Vasanth Mahal Palace-Mysore
 Vijay Vilas Palace, Mandavi – royal residence of rulers of Kutch
 Wasif Manzil – former royal residence, Murshidabad

Indonesia

Presidential palaces 
 Gedung Agung, The Presidential Palace in Yogyakarta.
 Istana Bogor, The Presidential Palace in Bogor.
 Istana Cipanas, The President's Leisure Palace in Puncak.
 Istana Merdeka, Jakarta, The President Official Residence.
 Istana Negara, Jakarta, The President Office.
 Istana Tampaksiring, The Presidential Palace in Bali.
 Istana Wakil Presiden, Jakarta, The Vice President Office.

Royal palaces 
 Istana Al Mukarramah – seat of Sintang Kingdom, Sintang Regency.
 Istana Al Watzikubillah – seat of Sambas Sultanate, Sambas Regency.
 Istana Amantubillah – seat of Mempawah Kingdom, Mempawah Regency.
 Istana Asahan (Bangunan Bersejarah – Balai Di Ujung Tanjung) – seat of Asahan Sultanate, Tanjungbalai.
 Istana Asi Mbojo – seat of Bima Sultanate, Kota Bima.
 Istana Asseraya Al Hasyimiyah – seat of Siak Sultanate, Siak Regency.
 Istana Bacan – seat of Bacan Sultanate, South Halmahera Regency.
 Istana Bala Kuning – seat of Sumbawa Sultanate, Sumbawa Regency.
 Istana Balla Lompoa – seat of Gowa Sultanate, Gowa Regency.
 Istana Banggai – seat of Banggai Sultanate, Banggai Islands Regency.
 Istana Datu Luwu – seat of Luwu Kingdom, Kota Palopo.
 Istana Gunung Tabur – seat of Gunung Tabur Sultanate, Berau Regency.
 Istana Indragiri – seat of Indragiri Kingdom, Indragiri Hulu Regency.
 Istana Ismahayana – seat of Landak Kingdom, Landak Regency.
 Istana Jailolo – seat of Jailolo Sultanate, North Halmahera Regency.
 Istana Kadriyah – seat of Pontianak Sultanate, Pontianak.
 Istana Kantor – seat of Riau-Lingga Sultanate, Kota Tanjung Pinang.
 Istana Kubu – seat of Kubu Kingdom, Kubu Raya Regency.
 Istana Kuning – seat of Kotawaringin Sultanate, West Kotawaringin Regency.
 Istana Maimun – seat of Deli Sultanate, Medan.
 Istana Malige – seat of Buton Sultanate, Baubau.
 Istana Mori – seat of Mori Kingdom, Morowali Regency.
 Istana Muliakarta – seat of Matan Kingdom, Ketapang Regency.
 Istana Niat – seat of Limalaras Kingdom, Batubara Regency.
 Istana Paku Negara – seat of Tayan Kingdom, Tayan Regency.
 Istana Rokan Hulu – seat of Rokan Hulu Kingdom, Rokan Hulu Regency.
 Istana Sadurangas – seat of Paser Belengkong Sultanate, Paser Regency.
 Istana Sambaliung – seat of Sambaliung Sultanate, Berau Regency.
 Istana Sayap – seat of Pelalawan Sultanate, Pelalawan Regency.
 Istana Serdang – seat of Serdang Sultanate, Serdang Bedagai Regency.
 Istana Surya Negara – seat of Sanggau Kingdom, Sanggau Regency.
 Istana Tanjung Palas – seat of Bulungan Sultanate, Bulungan Regency.
 Istana Ternate – seat of Ternate Sultanate, Ternate.
 Istana Tidore – seat of Tidore Sultanate, Tidore.
 Istana Tunggang Bosar – seat of Dhasa Nawalu Sultanate, South Tapanuli Regency.
 Istano Basa Pagaruyung – seat of Pagaruyung Kingdom, Tanah Datar Regency.
 Istano Kuto Lamo – seat of Palembang Darussalam Sultanate, Palembang.
 Kedaton Kutai Kartanegara – seat of Kutai Kartanegara Sultanate, Kutai Kartanegara Regency.
 Kraton Kacirebonan – seat of Kacirebonan Dynasty of Cirebon Sultanate, Cirebon.
 Kraton Kanoman – seat of Kanoman Dynasty of Cirebon Sultanate, Cirebon.
 Kraton Kasepuhan – seat of Kasepuhan Dynasty of Cirebon Sultanate, Cirebon.
 Kraton Ngayogyakarta Hadiningrat – seat of Yogyakarta Sultanate, Yogyakarta.
 Kraton Sumedang Larang – seat of Sumedang Larang Kingdom, Sumedang Regency.
 Kraton Sumenep – seat of Sumenep (East Madura) Duchy, Sumenep Regency.
 Kraton Surakarta Hadiningrat – seat of the Surakarta Sunanate, Surakarta.
 Pura Pakualaman – seat of Pakualaman Duchy, Yogyakarta.
 Pura Mangkunegaran – seat of Mangkunegaran Duchy, Surakarta.
 Puri Agung Bangli – seat of Bangli Kingdom, Bangli Regency.
 Puri Agung Denpasar – seat of Badung Kingdom, Denpasar.
 Puri Agung Gianyar – seat of Gianyar Kingdom, Gianyar Regency.
 Puri Agung Karangasem – seat of Karangasem Kingdom, Karangasem Regency.
 Puri Agung Klungkung – seat of Klungkung Kingdom, Klungkung Regency.
 Puri Agung Negara – seat of Jembrana Kingdom, Jembrana Regency.
 Puri Agung Singaraja – seat of Buleleng Kingdom, Buleleng Regency.
 Puri Agung Tabanan – seat of Tabanan Kingdom, Tabanan Regency.
 Puri Agung Ubud – seat of Ubud Princedom, Gianyar Regency.
 Saoraja La Pinceng – seat of Balusu Kingdom, Barru Regency.
 Saoraja Mallangga – seat of Wajo Sultanate, Wajo Regency.
 Saoraja Petta Ponggawae – seat of Bone Sultanate, Bone Regency.
 Sonaf Ba'a – seat of Rote Kingdom, Rote Ndao Regency.
 Sonaf Baun – seat of Amarasi Kingdom, Kupang.
 Sonaf Larantuka – seat of Larantuka Kingdom, East Flores Regency.
 Sonaf Nisnoni – seat of Kupang Kingdom, Kupang.
 Sonaf Oelolok – seat of Taolin Kingdom, North Central Timor Regency.
 Sonaf Sonbesi – seat of Amanuban Kingdom, South Central Timor Regency.

Iran

Palaces and pavilions 

 Ali Qapu, former residence of the Safavid dynasty after Shāh Abbās I, in Isfahan
 Apadana in Persepolis
 Chehel Sotoun in Isfahan
 Chehel Sotoun of Qazvin in Qazvin
 East-Azerbaijan State Palace
 Gate of All Nations in Persepolis
 Golestan Palace, former residence of the Qajar dynasty, in Tehran
 Hasht Behesht in Isfahan
 Marble Palace in Tehran
 Niavaran Palace Complex, former residence of the Qajar and Pahlavi dynasties
 Palace of Ardashir in Firouzabad, south of Shiraz
 Sadabad Palace in Tehran, former residence of the Pahlavi dynasty
 Saheb Qarani Palace, where Naser al-Din Shah Qajar lived, in Tehran
 Tabriz Municipality Palace, the head office of the municipal government of Tabriz
 Tachara, one of the interior palaces in Persepolis
 Takht-e Soleymān in West Azerbaijan
 Throne Hall, second largest palace of Persepolis after the Apadana
 Tehran Municipality Palace, which was located on the north side of Tupkhaneh

Castles and citadels 
 Alamut Castle, a mountain fortress in Gilan Province
 Arg e Bam in Bam
 Arg e Furg in South Khorasan
 Arg e Nehbandan in Birjand
 Arg e Ryan in Kerman
 Arg e Tabriz in Tabriz
 Arg e Tus in Tus
 Arshoq Castle in Mishgin
 Babak Castle on the top of a mountain in the Arasbaran forests
 Dežbār in Khorramabad
 Fort of Our Lady of the Conception in Hormuz Island
 Dezh Dokhtar in Kerman
 Markooh Fortress in Ramsar
 Meimoon Castle in Qazvin
 Narin Castle in Yazd Province
 Rudkhan Castle, a brick and stone medieval castle in Gilan Province
 Shush Castle in Hormuz Island

Iraq 
 Republican Palace
 Al Salam Palace (Baghdad, Iraq)
 Al-Faw Palace
 Radwaniyah Palace

Italy

Rome 
 Palazzo Altemps
 Palazzo Barberini – It houses Galleria Nazionale d'Arte Antica
 Palazzo Borghese
 Palazzo Colonna
 Palazzo Corsini – office of the Accademia dei Lincei
 Palazzo della Cancelleria – former papal palace
 Palazzo della Civiltà Italiana – Also known as 'Colosseo Quadrato' in EUR
 Palazzo dei Conservatori
 Palazzo di Venezia – former the Embassy of the Republic of Venice
 Palazzo Doria Pamphilj
 Palazzo Farnese – now the French Embassy in Italy
 Palazzo Laterano – former papal residence, currently the seat of Diocese of Rome
 Palazzo Madama – currently House of the Italian Senate
 Palazzo Montecitorio – currently Lower House of Italian Parliament
 Palazzo Quirinale – Presidential Palace, former residence of the kings of Italy
 Palazzo Spada

Florence 
 Bargello – Also known as the Palazzo del Popolo
 Palazzo Medici
 Palazzo Pitti – former seat of the Grand Duke of Tuscany
 Palazzo Rucellai
 Palazzo Strozzi
 Palazzo Uffizi
 Palazzo Vecchio – City Hall of Firenze

Venice 
 Ca' d'Oro
 Ca' Foscari
 Ca' Rezzonico
 Ca' Vendramin Calergi – now home of the Wagner Museum and Venice Casino
 Doge's Palace – former seat of the Doge of Venice
 Palazzo Barbarigo
 Palazzo Contarini del Bovolo
 Palazzo Dandolo
 Palazzo Grassi
 Palazzo Labia – now the regional HQ of RAI (Radiotelevisione Italiana)
 Palazzo Malipiero
 Palazzo Venier dei Leoni – now the Peggy Guggenheim Collection

Elsewhere 
 Palazzo Re Enzo, Bologna
 Palazzo del Podestà, Bologna
 Palazzo dei Notai, Bologna
 Royal Palace of Caserta, Caserta (near Napoli) – former seat of the kings of Two Sicilies
 Papal Palace, Castel Gandolfo – Summer residence of the Pope
 Palazzo dei Diamanti, Ferrara – currently houses 'Pinacoteca Nazionale'
 Palazzo Bianco, Genoa
 Torre e Palazzo de Félice, Rosciano – an 11th-century castle and former ancestral palace of the Counts di Panzutti of the de Félice family
 Palazzo de Felice, Somma Vesuviana – a 16th-century palace of the Counts di Panzutti of the De Felice family
 Palazzo de Felice, Grottaglie – an 18th-century palace of the Counts di Panzutti of the de Felice family
 Palazzo Pfanner, Lucca
 Palazzo del Te, Mantua – former seat of the Dukes of Mantua
 Palazzo Litta, Milan
 Castello Sforzesco, Milan – residence of the dukes of Milan
 Royal Villa of Monza, Monza
 Ducal Palace, Modena – residence of the dukes of Modena
 Royal Palace, Naples
 Royal Palace of Capodimonte, Naples – Summer palace of the kings of the Two Sicilies; today home to Museo di Capodimonte
 Palazzo dei Normanni, Palermo – former residence of Holy Roman Emperors and kings of Sicily
 Ducal Palace, Parma – residence of the dukes of Parma
 Ducal Palace of Colorno, Colorno
 Palazzo della Carovana, Pisa
 Palace of Portici, Portici
 Palazzo Pubblico, Siena
 Royal Palace of Turin, Torino – former residence of the dukes of Savoy and kings of Sardinia
 Palazzina di Stupinigi, Torino
 Palazzo Carignano, Torino
 Castello del Valentino, Torino
 Palazzo Ducale, Urbino – former seat of the Dukes of Urbino
 Palazzo Canossa, Verona
 Palazzo Chiericati, Vicenza
 Miramare Castle, Trieste
 Royal Palace of Carditello, near Caserta – hunting site and then a farm by of the kings of the Two Sicilies

Japan 

 Akasaka Palace (State Guest-House: 迎賓館), Tokyo &　Kyoto
 Fukiage Omiya Palace – Imperial residence of the Empress Dowager, Tokyo
 Heijo Palace (平城京) – former capital, Nara
 Heian Palace, Kyoto
 Imperial Palace (皇居) – Imperial Court and Residence, Tokyo
 Katsura Detached Palace (Katsura Imperial Villa: 桂離宮) – former imperial palace, Kyoto
 Kyoto Imperial Palace (京都御所), Kyoto
 Kyoto Omiya Palace – Imperial residence, Kyoto
 Sento Imperial Palace – Imperial residence, Kyoto
 Shugaku-in Detached Palace (Shugaku-in Imperial Villa) – former imperial palace, Kyoto
 Rokuhara Yakata (六波羅館) and Nishihachijo House (西八条邸) – former residence of Taira no Kiyomori, Kyoto.
 Yukimi Imperial Palace (雪見御所) – former residence of Taira no Kiyomori,    Fukuhara-kyō.
 Yanagi no Gosho (柳之御所) – former residence of Northern Fujiwara, Hiraizumi, Iwate.
 Kyara Gosho (伽羅御所) – former residence of Northern Fujiwara, Hiraizumi, Iwate.
 Okura Imperial Palace (大倉御所) – former residence of Kamakura shogunate.
 Utsunomiya Zushi Imperial Palace (宇都宮辻子御所) – former residence of Kamakura shogunate.
 Wakamiya Oji Imperial Palace (若宮大路御所) – former residence of Kamakura shogunate.
 Sanjo Bomon Dono (三条坊門殿) – former residence of Ashikaga shogunate, Kyoto.
 Hana no-gosho (花の御所) – former residence of Ashikaga shogunate, Kyoto.
 Azuchi Castle (安土城) – former residence of Oda Nobunaga,    Ōmihachiman，Shiga Prefecture.
 Osaka Castle (大坂城) – former residence of Kampaku Toyotomi Hideyoshi, Osaka.
 Jurakudai (聚楽第) – former residence of Kampaku Toyotomi Hideyoshi,     Kyoto.
 Edo Castle (江戶城) – former residence of Tokugawa shogunate, Tokyo.
 Nijō Castle (二条城) – former palace, Kyoto
 Shuri Castle (首里城) – former seat of the Kings of Ryūkyū, Naha

Jordan 
Raghadan Palace, Amman. Royal Residence of the Hussein Family

Korea 

 Goguryeo
 Anhak Palace, Pyeongyang
 Palace site, Jian, Jilin
 Baekje
 Palace site, Buyeo
 Palace site, Gongju
 Wanggungli site, Iksan
 Silla
 Eastern Palace, Gyeongju
 Banwolseong, Gyeongju
 Balhae
 Palace site, Ning'an
 Taebong
 Palace site, Cheolwon
 Goryeo
 Manwoldae, Main royal palace, Kaesong
 Goryeo Palace, Ganghwa
 Suchang Palace, Kaesong
 Yeongyeong Palace, Kaesong
 Daehwa Palace, Pyongyang
 Joseon
 Deoksugung, Seoul
 Changdeokgung, Seoul
 Changgyeonggung, Seoul
 Gyeongbokgung, Main royal palace, Seoul
 Gyeonghuigung, Seoul
 Hwaseong Haenggung Palace, Suwon
 Namhansan Haenggung Palace, Namhansanseong

Kuwait 
 Seif Palace – the official residence of the head of state
 Bayan Palace
 Al Salam Palace – Currently a Museum
 Kuwait Red Palace – Currently a Museum
  Dasman Palace – Established in 1904, Sheikh Ahmed Al-Sabah, the tenth ruler of Kuwait in 1930 made it his official residence, It is currently one of Kuwait's historic palaces.
  Mishref Palace – Located in Mishref and was Built by Sheikh Mubarak Al-Sabah in 1900, it was restored in the early 1940s.
  Naif Palace – built In 1919, during the reign of Sheikh Salem Al-Mubarak Al-Sabah. It is currently the Building of Al Asimah Governorate.

Laos 

 Royal Palace (Royal Palace) – former residence of Lao royal family, Luang Prabang

 Haw Kham (Presidential Palace) – former residence of President of the Lao People's Democratic Republic, Vientiane

 Champasak Palace (Royal Palace) – former residence of Chao Boun Oum, Pakse

Latvia 
 Bīriņi Palace
 Cesvaine Palace
 Cīrava Palace
 Kazdanga Palace
 Krāslava New Palace
 Laidi Palace
 Mežotne Palace
 Mitava Palace of the Dukes of Courland
 Pope Palace
 Preiļi Palace
 Rundale Palace of the Dukes of Courland
 Snēpele Palace
 Stāmeriena Palace
 Varakļāni Palace
 Vērgale Palace

Lebanon 

 Baabda Palace (Presidential Palace)
 Beiteddine Palace (Palace of Lebanese Princes until the fall of the Ottoman Empire, Summer presidential residence)
 Bustros Palace (Beirut grand mansion, currently the seat of the Lebanese Ministry of Foreign Affairs)
 Donna Maria Sursock mansion (Aristocratic villa and grounds in Sawfar, damaged during the Lebanese Civil War and the Syrian occupation, now an event venue)
 Fakhreddine Palace (Palace complex of Lebanese Prince Fakhreddine)
 Grand Serail (Prime minister Headquarters)
 Hneineh Palace (Beirut grand mansion, heavily damaged)
 Malhame Palace (Beirut grand mansion, largely defaced, seat of the Lebanese Phalanges party)
 Mir Amin Palace (Currently a luxury hotel)
 Moussa Sursock palace (Beirut grand mansion and landmark)
 Petit Serail (Demolished by the French Mandate authorities in 1920)
 Pine Residence (Currently houses the French Embassy in Beirut)
 Debbane Palace (Historicall grand mansion in Sidon, now a museum)
 Robert Mouawad Palace (Beirut grand mansion, currently a Museum)
 Alfred Sursock Palace (Beirut grand mansion and grounds, currently a Museum of Modern Art)
 Villa Linda Sursock (Aristocratic mansion, now an event venue)
 Ziade Palace (Beirut grand mansion, heavily)

Lithuania 

 Historical Presidential Palace, Kaunas
 Presidential Palace, Vilnius
 Radziwill Palace, Vilnius
 Royal Palace in Vilnius (being rebuilt)
 Sapieha Palace in Vilnius
 Slushko Palace in Vilnius
 Tiškevičiai Palace, Palanga
 Tyzenhaus Palace in Vilnius
 Trakai Island Castle in Trakai
 Vileišis Palace, Vilnius

Luxembourg 
 Grand Ducal Palace, Luxembourg

Malaysia 

 Official palaces of the Yang di-Pertuan Agong
 Istana Negara (Jalan Istana) – Former royal residence of the King of Malaysia, Kuala Lumpur (currently served as Royal Museum of Malaysia)
 Istana Negara (Jalan Tuanku Abdul Halim) – Royal residence of the King of Malaysia, Kuala Lumpur
 Istana Melawati – Second national palace of Malaysia, located in the centre of Presint 1 PutrajayaIstana HinggapIstana Hinggap can be categorized into two types. First, there are the city palaces located in Malaysia's capital Kuala Lumpur. It functions as the royal residence for the respective Sultans, Raja or Yang di-Pertuan Besar in Kuala Lumpur. There are nine Istana Hinggap built respectively for the nine Kings of Malaysia. Second, there are the temporary/leisure palaces when the Sultan, Raja or Yang di-Pertuan Besar goes to visit their territory inside/outside their own state. Some of them even have Istana Hinggap outside Malaysia.List of Istana Hinggap in Kuala Lumpur Istana Hinggap Perlis – Raja of Perlis palace at Jalan Eaton
 Istana Hinggap Kedah – Sultan of Kedah palace at Jalan Kedah,
 Istana Hinggap Perak – Sultan of Perak palace at Jalan Persekutuan,
 Istana Hinggap Selangor – Sultan of Selangor palace at Jalan Sultan Salahuddin
 Istana Hinggap Negeri Sembilan – Yang di-Pertuan Besar of Negeri Sembilan palace at Jalan Persekutuan
 Istana Hinggap Johor – Sultan of Johor palace at Cangkat Kia Peng
 Istana Hinggap Pahang – Sultan of Pahang palace at Bukit Kewangan
 Istana Hinggap Terengganu – Sultan of Terengganu palace at Jalan Tun Razak
 Istana Hinggap Kelantan – Sultan of Kelantan palace at Jalan WickhamList of Istana for the constituent statesPerlis
 Istana Arau – Official palace for the Raja of Perlis. This palace was built in 1905 during the reign of Tuanku Raja Syed Alwi Jamalullail.
 Istana Fauzana – The Raja of Perlis' residential palace in Kangar
 Istana Kenangan Indah – located in Repoh. Previously official residence of the late Tuanku Raja Syed Putra Jamalullail and his consort. After Tuanku Raja Syed Putra Jamalullail passed away and Duli Yang Maha Mulia Tuanku Syed Sirajuddin Ibni Al-marhum Tuanku Syed Putra Jamalullail take the throne, this palace has become the official palace for YMM Raja Perempuan Besar Perlis.

Kedah

 Istana Anak Bukit – Official palace for the Sultan of Kedah.
 Balai Besar – Located in Alor Setar facing Masjid Zahir (Zahir Mosque). This palace was built in 1735 was almost destroyed twice in 1770 (attacked by Siamese army) and 1821 (attacked by Bugis army). The palace is supported by 42 main pillars now serves as Kedah Royal Museum.
 Istana Kuning – Old residential palace for the Sultan of Kedah.
 Istana Pelamin – Or Istana Kota Setar. Currently the Kedah Royal Museum. Built in 1732 by Y.A.M. Duli Yang Maha Mulia Almarhum Sultan Muhammad Jiwa Zainal Adilin Muazzam Shah.
 Istana Bukit Malut – Royal Palace located in Langkawi Island, Kedah.
 Istana Kuala Chegar – Built in 1920 by Sultan Abdul Hamid Halim Shah (1882 – 1943).
 Istana Seri Pelangi – Located at Jalan Tunku bendahara, Alor Setar. Currently the widow of DYMM Amarhum Sultan Abdul Halim of Kedah, DYMM Che Puan Besar Kedah, (formerly known as Sultanah Haminah) reside here.
 Istana Sepachendera – Built in 1882 by Sultan Abdul Hamid Halim Shah (1882 – 1943) for his wife, Che Sepachendera.
Istana Nur Iman - located at Jalan Lumba Kuda.
Istana Kesuma - Kedah Crown Prince palace.
Istana Lubuk Pusing - Build by Sultan Abdul Hamid Halim Shah, destroyed in the second World war.
Istana Pumpong  - Build by Tunku Abdul Aziz,Crown Prince of Kedah during the reign of Sultan Abdul Hamid and was demolished in the 70s.

Pulau Pinang
 Seri Mutiara  – The official residence of the Yang di-Pertua Negeri, the Governor of Penang. This palace was built in 1890
 Istana Kedah – Palace owned by the Sultan of Kedah in Pulau Pinang

Perak
 
 Istana Cempaka Sari – Residential palace of Sultan Nazrin in Ipoh Sultan Nazrin Muizuddin Shah ibni Sultan Azlan Muhibbuddin Shah
 Istana Hulu – The palace, designed with a mixture of Western neo-classical and Islamic styles, was built in 1903 for the 28th Sultan of Perak.
 Istana Iskandariah – The official residence of all the Sultans of Perak who have been installed since its completion in 1933.  The palace is named after Sultan Iskandar Shah (1918–1938) who initiated its construction.
 Istana Idrisiah – Or Istana Idris or Istana Negara Perak built by Sultan Idris Murshidul Aadzam Shah ibni al-Marhum Raja Bendahara Alang Iskandar in 1895. In 1931 the palace was demolished to give way for the construction of the new Istana Iskandariah.
 Istana Kenangan – The Perak Royal Museum was built as a royal residence in 1926. It is an amazing architecture which was built from woods without a single nail.
 Istana Kinta – Royal palace in Ipoh, Perak
 Istana Raja Muda – Official palace for Crown Prince of Perak in Ipoh. Current Raja Muda of Perak is Duli Yang Teramat Mulia Raja Muda Perak Raja Jaafar ibni Almarhum Raja Muda Musa
 Istana Raja Muda Lama – The former official residence for Crown Prince of Perak in Teluk Intan. It was built in 1922 for Almarhum Raja Muda Abdul Aziz (later become Sultan Abdul Aziz). The palace was abandoned in 1988 when DYTM Raja Muda Raja Dr. Nazrin Shah moved to Istana Tetamu in Ipoh
 Istana Raja Di Hilir – Raja Di Hilir is the second in line for Perak's throne after the Raja Muda. Current Raja Di Hilir is Duli Yang Amat Mulia Raja Di-Hilir Perak Raja Iskandar Dzulkarnain ibni Almarhum Sultan Idris Iskandar Al-Mutawakkil Alallahi Shah II Afifurlah who also the son-in-law of the late Sultan Abdul Halim of Kedah.
 Istana Billah -
 Kellie's Castle was meant to be a home away from home for Scottish Planter, William Kellie Smith in the 19th century in Batu Gajah.
 Istana Riswin - residence of the Crown Princess of Perak, Raja Nazhatul Shima.
 Istana Firuz - residence of Raja Iskandar Dzulkarnain Ibni Sultan Idris Iskandar Al- Mutawakkil Alallahi Shah II Afifurlah.

Selangor

 Istana Alam Shah – The Sultan of Selangor's official palace in Klang
 Istana Bandar – A big palace made of wood and marble built for the fifth Sultan of Selangor, Sultan Alauddin Sulaiman. This palace is also known as Istana Temasya.
 Istana Bukit Kayangan – The Sultan of Selangor's state palace in Shah Alam
 Istana Darul Ehsan – Royal palace in Putrajaya
 Istana Mestika – The official residence of the crown prince of Selangor, also in Shah Alam
 Istana Mahkota Puri – Built in 1899 in Klang. This palace has been demolished to make way for the building of the new Istana Alam Shah.
 Istana Pantai Bahagia – Resting palace of Sultan Selangor in Morib
 Istana Jemaah – Currently serves as school (Kolej Islam Sultan Alam Shah) located in Klang not far from Istana Alam Shah. This palace is named after the Queen of Selangor who was also the second Raja Permaisuri Agong (Supreme Queen) of Malaysia, Tengku Ampuan Jemaah.

Negeri Sembilan

 Istana Ampang Tinggi – Was commissioned by the 5th Yamtuan of Negri Sembilan, Yamtuan Ulin Ibni Almarhum Yamtuan Hitam. The palace was built between 1865 and 1870 at Ampang Tinggi ("High Dam") in Kuala Pilah
 Istana Sri Menanti – Istana Seri Menanti was the official residence of the Negeri Sembilan royal family until 1931 and was turned into a Royal Museum in 1992
 Istana Besar Seri Menanti – Official Palace for Yang Dipertuan Besar of Negeri Sembilan.
 Istana Hinggap Seremban – Residential palace of Yang Dipertuan Besar of Negeri Sembilan in Seremban
 Istana Baroh – Located in Seri Menanti
 Istana Salatin – Currently the residential palace for Tuanku Tunku Ampuan Najihah binti Almarhum Tunku Besar Burhanuddin

Melaka
 Istana Melaka – the official residence of the Yang di-Pertua Negeri, the Governor of Melaka in Bukit Beruang
 Seri Melaka – built in the 17th century. Currently functioning as Muzium Tuan Yang Terutama since 1996 Muzium Tuan Yang Terutama
 Istana Kesultanan Melaka – Malacca royal museum. The current palace is smaller replica of the original palace.

Johor

 Istana Besar – A royal palace of the Sultan of Johor which is located in Johor Bahru. The palace is opened to public as Royal Museum of Johor but will be closed for public during royal events.
 Istana Bukit Serene – The Sultan of Johor's palace in Bukit Serene, Johor built in 1933 and completed in 1939. The palace has a tower of 35 meters height facing Danga Bay.
 Istana Bukit Pelangi – The royal palace of the Tunku Mahkota (crown prince) of Johor
 Istana Pasir Pelangi – The royal palace of the Royal Family of Johor
 Istana Tanjong – Resting palace of the Sultan of Johor which is located in Muar
 Shooting Box – Resting palace of the Sultan of Johor which is located in Segamat
 Sri Lambak – Resting palace of the Sultan of Johor which is located in Kluang

Pahang

 Istana Abu Bakar – The Sultan of Pahang's official Palace in Pekan
 Istana Abdul Aziz – Official palace for Crown Prince of Pahang, KDYTM Tengku Mahkota Pahang Tengku Abdullah Al-Haj Ibni Sultan Haji Ahmad Shah Al-Musta’in Billah dan KDYTM Tengku Puan Pahang. the name of the palace is derived from combination of Tengku Abdullah (crown prince of Pahang) and Tunku Azizah (crown princess of Pahang)
 Istana Mahkota – Located at Jalan Telok Cempedak, Kuantan
 Istana Mangga Tunggal – Built in 1920 during the reign of Sultan Abdullah Al-Mu’tassim Billah. the palace is named after a single mango tree that grow in the palace compound.
 Istana Sri Angkasa -Royal palace in Cameron Highlands
 Istana Sri Udara – Royal palace in “Bandar Ikan Patin” Temerloh
 Istana Leban Tunggal – Completed in 1937, this palace is owned by Almarhum YAM Tengku Besar Pahang II, Tengku Sulaiman ibni Almarhum Sultan Ahmad Al-Mu’azzam Shah. currently the public library at Pekan
 Istana Kota Beram – Currently royal museum of Pahang
 Istana Hinggap Kuala Lipis – Previously the residence for British officer since 1926. In 1948 it is converted into official residence for Menteri Besar of Pahang. In 1955 the residence is converted into a palace.
 Istana Melati – Built in 1966 in Kampung Mengkasar, Pekan for YH Dato’ Maria Menado who at that time the wife of Al-Marhum Sultan Abu Bakar Ri’ayatuddin Al-Mu’adzam Shah Ibni Al-Marhum Sultan Abdullah Al-Mu’tasim Billah. The palace was built to replace Balai Gambang

Terengganu

 Istana Badariah – Royal palace built in 1940 by Sultan Sulaiman Badrul Alam Shah. This palace also functioned as the Renca-Consol during Japanese occupation in Malaya.
 Istana Maziah – It is believed to have been constructed during the reign of Sultan Zainal Abidin Ill in Terengganu. It was built in 1897 to replace the Istana Hijau. This palace is located at Bukit Puteri
 Istana Nur Nadhirah – Palace for the Crown Prince of Terengganu Istana Nur Nadhirah This palace was built in 1920 after the signing of Terengganu-Inggeris Treaty. During the Japanese occupation in Malaya, this palace served as the official residence of Shuchiji Kakha ( Shu Chokan Kakha ). After World War II until December 1956 this palace served as the official residence of British Governor.
 Istana Syarqiyyah – Royal palace in Chendering, Terengganu. This is the newest palace for Sultan of Terengganu
 Istana Al-Muktafibillah Shah

Kelantan

 Istana Balai Besar – The palace was built by Sultan Muhamad II in 1840 in Kota Bharu
 Istana Batu – The Royal Museum is located in the middle of the Kota Bharu, Kelantan. The design of the palace was inspired by Sultan Ismail Ibni Almarhum Sultan Muhammad IV who reigned from 1920 to 1944.
 Istana Bukit Tanah – The Palace was built by Sultan Ismail Ibni Almarhum Sultan Muhammad IV in 1920 in Tumpat, Kelantan
 Istana Jahar – Built-in 1887, Istana Jahar was a gift from Sultan Mahmud II to his grandson, Long Kundur. Today, this palace is known as the Museum of Royal Traditions and Customs Kelantan.
 Istana Kota Lama – Old royal palace of Kelantan
 Istana Mahkota – Official residence of the previous ruler, Sultan Ismail Petra in Kubang Kerian, Kelantan
 Istana Negeri – The Sultan of Kelantan's official residence in Kubang Kerian, Kelantan
 Istana Telipot – Official residence of Tengku Muhammad Faris Petra, Crown Prince & Regent of Kelantan (then) in Kota Bharu, Kelantan

Sarawak

 The Astana – Currently the official residence of the Yang di-Pertua Negeri, the Governor of Sarawak. The second Rajah, Charles Brooke, built this palace in 1870

Sabah
 Istana Seri Kinabalu – The official residence of the Yang di-Pertua Negeri, the Governor of Sabah.

 Mexico 

 Government Palace of Chihuahua, Chihuahua – seat of the Government of the State of Chihuahua
 Palacio de Alvarado, Chihuahua – House of one of the richest silver barons in Mexico.

 Castillo de Chapultepec, Mexico City – former Imperial residence and Presidential Palace, military academy, and currently, home of the Museo Natural de Historia.
 Palace of San Lázaro, Mexico City – House of the Congress of Mexico.
 Los Pinos Official Residence, Mexico City – official residence of the president of Mexico.
 National Palace, Mexico City – former viceregal and presidential palace; currently serves as the seat of the executive, and houses State ceremonies, such as receptions, banquets, and the Independence celebration.
 Palacio de Bellas Artes, Mexico City
 Palacio de Correos de Mexico, Mexico City
 Palace of Iturbide, Mexico City
 Palacio de Minería, Mexico City
 Museo Nacional del Arte, Mexico City
 Hospicio Cabañas, Guadalajara – Colonial building which housed the city hospital during the Viceroyalty; a UNESCO world heritage site.
 Palace of Government, Monterrey – seat of the Government of Nuevo León.
 Palacio del Obispado, Monterrey
 Castillo de San Juán de Ulúa, Veracruz – former Viceregal and Presidential residence. Later served as a prison. Currently houses a museum.
 Palacio Canton, Mérida – now serves as a museum

 Monaco 

 The Prince's Palace – seat of the Prince of Monaco

 Mongolia 
 Winter Palace – former residence of the Bogd Khan, Ulan Bator

 Morocco 

 Badi Palace
 Bahia Palace
 Dar Ba Mohammed Chergui
 Dar el Bacha – now a museum
 Dar Batha – now a museum
 Dar Glaoui
 Dar Jamai in Fez – now a hotel
 Dar Jamai in Meknes – now a museum
 Dar al-Makhzen in Fez – Royal Palace
 Dar al-Makhzen in Rabat – Royal Palace
 Dar al-Makhzen in Tangier – former Royal Palace, now a museum
 Dar Mnebhi in Fez
 Dar Mnebhi in Marrakesh – now a museum
 Dar Moqri
 Dar Si Said – now a museum
 Kasbah of Marrakesh – historically a royal citadel, now containing a present-day royal palace and a residential neighbourhood
 Kasbah of Moulay Ismail – built as a vast royal citadel, now containing a present-day royal palace and a mix of neighbourhoods
 Kasbah Taourirt
 Kasbah of Telouet

 Myanmar 
 Mya Nan San Kyaw (The Royal Emerald Palace) – former seat of the Konbaung Dynasty, Mandalay
 Kanbawzathadi Palace The former seat of Bayinnaung
 Mrauk U Palace, the former seat of the Mrauk U based Arakanese Kingdom from 1431 to 1785.

 Nepal 

 Bagh Durbar
 Bhaktapur Durbar
 Gorkha Durbar
 Hanuman Dhoka Palace
 Hetauda Durbar
 Kakani Durbar
 Lal Durbar
 Lumjung Durbar
 Nagarjun Durbar
 Narayanhity Royal Palace – scene of the 2001 Nepalese royal massacre
 Nuwakot Durbar
 Palpa Durbar
 Patan Durbar
 Rani Mahal
 Seto Durbar
 Sinduligadi Durbar
 Singha Durbar
 Tangaal Durbar
 Thapathali Durbar

 The Netherlands 

 Bronbeek – former royal residence, Arnhem
 City Hall of Tilburg – former royal residence, Tilburg
 Het Loo (Paleis het Loo) – former royal residence, Apeldoorn
 Het Oude Loo – Private royal residence, Apeldoorn
 Huis ten Bosch Palace – royal residence, The Hague
 Drakensteyn Castle – Private royal residence, Baarn
 Koninklijke Schouwburg - former royal residence, The Hague
 Mauritshuis – former royal residence, The Hague
 Noordeinde Palace (Paleis Noordeinde) – royal residence, The Hague
 Royal Palace of Amsterdam (Koninklijk Paleis Amsterdam or Paleis op de Dam) – royal residence, Amsterdam
 Soestdijk Palace (Paleis Soestdijk) – former royal residence, Soestdijk
 Stadhouderlijk Hof – former royal residence, Leeuwarden
 Kneuterdijk Palace (Paleis Kneuterdijk) – former royal residence, The Hague
 Lange Voorhout Palace (Paleis Lange Voorhout) – former royal residence, The Hague
 Peace Palace (Vredespaleis) – Houses the international court of justice (judicial body of the United Nations), The Hague

 New Zealand 

 Tūrangawaewae – official residence of the head of the Māori King Movement currently King Tuheitia Paki. The complex consists of Mahinarangi, Turongo and other substantial buildings used by the Kingitanga for a number of larger Iwi gatherings.

Apart from the large complex at Turangawaewae Marae located in the town of Ngaruawahia, the previous Māori Monarch Te Atairangikaahu had a home at Waahi Marae in Huntly where she lived for most of her 40-year reign with her consort Whatumoana Paki.  The Māori King or Queen are required to attend 33 Poukai annually conducted at Marae loyal to the Kingitangi movement.  Many of these Marae maintain residences for the Māori King or Queen for them to use during such visits.

 Nigeria 
 Olowo Palace in Owo Ondo State  which contains more than one hundred courtyards, each with a unique traditional function. 

 Norway 
 Royal Palace, Oslo (Slottet) – royal residence
 Oscarshall – royal summer residence
 Ledaal – official residence of the King of Norway in Stavanger
 Stiftsgården

 Oman 
 Al Alam Palace – royal residence
 Bait Barka – Sultan's retreat in Barka
 Hisn Salalah – the Sultan's main waterfront royal complex residence in Salalah
 Hisn Seeb – Sultan's Farm in Seeb which contains hundreds of pure bred Arabian Horses.
 Mamoora Palace – one of Sultans Ranch in Salalah
 Razat Farm – Sultan's farm in Salalah adjacent to Mamoora Palace
 Sohar Palace – Sultan's Ranch in Sohar
 Jibreen palace – was Imam Bularab bin Sultan's summer retreat.
 Bait al falaj – former royal residence.
 Hamed bin mohammed palace – residence of Hamed bin Mohammed designed by the famous Fareesh al Ustadh
 Awlad seif palace – residence of Salim bin Seif.
 Awlad Murshed palace – designed by Fareesh al Ustadh
 awlad al Maleel palace – residence of Saeed bin Salim walad al Maleel.

 Pakistan 

 Aiwan-e-Sadr – Islamabad
 Mohatta Palace – Karachi
 Sadiq Garh Palace -Bahawalpur
 Gulzar Mahal – Bahawalpur
 Farukh Mahal – Bahawalpur
 Nishat Mahal – Bahawalpur
 Dubai Mahal – Bahawalpur
 Noor Mahal – Bahawalpur
 Omar Hayat Mahal – Jhang
 Raiwind Palace – Lahore
 Omar Hayat Mahal – Chiniot
 Sheesh Mahal (Lahore) – Lahore
 Derawar Fort – Bahawalpur
 Darbar Mahal – Bahawalpur
 Lal Haveli – Rawalpindi
 Ranikot – Sindh
 Bedi Mahal – Rawalpindi
 Shahi Qila – Lahore
 Faiz Mahal – Khairpur
 Bala Hissar – Peshwar

 Paraguay 

 Mburuvichá Roga House, Paraguayan Presidential Residence – (Asunción)
 Palacio de los López, Paraguayan Seat of Government – (Asunción)

 Peru 
 Archbishop Palace, Lima – Sear of the Roman Catholic Archdiocese of Lima
 Government Palace, Lima – Peruvian Seat of Government and home to the executive branch.
 Legislative Palace, Lima – seat of the Congress of Peru
 Machu Picchu, Cusco – An Inca Palace, now a major tourist destination.
 Osambela House, Lima – colonial palace in the Historic center of Lima
 Palace of Justice, Lima – seat of the Supreme Court of Peru
 Torre Tagle Palace, Lima – headquarters of the Ministry of Foreign Relations of Peru

 Philippines 

 Coconut Palace
 Malacañang Palace – the official residence of the president of the Philippines, Manila
 Malacañang sa Sugbo – the presidential residence in Cebu City
 The Mansion, Baguio – the presidential residence in Baguio
 Palacio del Gobernador – historical official residence of former Governor Generals, now used as a government building
 Ayuntamiento de Manila – former official residence and office of the Mayor of Manila, now houses the Bureau of Treasury.
 Archbishop's Palace – historical residence of the Arzobispo de Manila in Intramuros
 Archbishop's Palace – current residence of the Arzobispo de Manila in Villa San Miguel, Mandaluyong.
 Archbishop's Palace – temporary residence of the Archbishop of Manila in the past, located in San Fernando, Pampanga
 The Astana Putih or The Sultan's Palace – original residence of the Sultan of Sulu located in Maimbung, Sulu.
Torogan – Classical period residences for maranao Sultan.

 Poland 

 Abbot's Palace (Oliwa), Gdańsk
 Branicki Palace, Białystok
 Czapski Palace, Warsaw
 Drogosze Palace, Drogosze
 Gorzeński Palace, Śmiełów
 Jabłonna Palace
 Kozłówka Palace
 Kurozwęki Palace
 Kielce Palace, Kielce
 Lipnik Palace, Bielsko-Biała
 Lancut Palace, Łańcut
 Nieborów Palace
 Pszczyna Palace
 Radomicki Palace, Konarzewo, Poznań County
 Radziwiłł Palace, Antonin near Ostrzeszów
 Rydzyna Palace
 Tęgoborze Palace
 Włodowice Palace
 Wrocław Palace
 Żyrowa Palace, Żyrowa

 Warsaw 
 Belweder – former seat of the president, Warsaw
 Czapski Palace, Warsaw
 Krasiński's Palace, Warsaw
 Królikarnia, Warsaw
 Myślewicki Palace, Warsaw
 Natolin, Warsaw
 Ostrogski Palace, Warsaw
 Presidential Palace, Warsaw – seat of the president
 Palace of the Four Winds, Warsaw
 Royal Castle, Warsaw – former royal palace
 Sapieha Palace in Warsaw
 Staszic Palace, Warsaw
 The Palace in Łazienki Park, Warsaw
 Saxon Palace, Warsaw
 Tin-roofed Palace, Warsaw
 Ujazdowski Castle
 Wilanów Palace – former summer palace of the King of Poland

 Portugal 

 Alentejo 
 Ducal Palace of Vila Viçosa
 Palace of the Dukes of Cadaval (Évora)

 Beira 
 Paço de Sobre-Ribas
 Solar dos Cancelos
 Solar do Visconde de Almendra
 Palácio de Reriz
 Buçaco Palace
 Palácio dos Figueiredos
 Palácio Sotto Maior
 Palácio do Conselheiro Branco
 Palácio da Lousã
 Palácio Landal

 Douro Litoral 
 Palacete de Belomonte
 Palácio da Bolsa
 Palácio das Cardosas
 Palácio dos Carrancas
 Palácio do Bolhão
 Palácio do Freixo
 Episcopal Palace of Porto
 Palacete Pinto Leite
 Palácio de São Bento da Vitória
 Palácio de São João Novo
 Palácio dos Terenas
 Palacete dos Viscondes de Balsemão

 Minho 
 Episcopal Palace of Braga
 Paço de Lanheses
 Castle of D. Chica
 Biscainhos Museum
 Palace of the Dukes of Braganza
 Paço de São Cipriano
 Palácio Vila Flor
 Palácio Igreja Velha

 Estremadura 
 Ajuda National Palace – former royal palace
 Beau-Séjour Palace
 Belém Palace – former royal palace; seat of the president of Portugal
 Bemposta Palace – former royal palace
 Burnay Palace
 Correio-Mor Palace – former seat of the High-Couriers of the Kingdom
 Estaus Palace
 Galveias Palace
 Mafra National Palace – former royal palace
 Monserrate Palace
 Palace of Necessidades – former royal palace; seat of the Ministry of Foreign Affairs (Portugal)
 Palace of the Counts of Azambuja
 Palace of the Counts of Penafiel
 Palace of the Counts of Redondo
 Palácio dos Condes da Calheta
 Palace of the Dukes of Palmela
 Palace of the Marquesses of Fronteira
 Pena National Palace – former royal palace
 Pimenta Palace
 Queluz National Palace – former royal palace
 Ribeira Palace – former royal palace
 São Bento Palace – seat of Portuguese Parliament
 Seteais Palace
 Sintra National Palace – former royal palace
 Sotto Mayor Palace
 Verride Palace
 Palácio dos Condes de Castro Guimarães
 Palácio Ludovice
 Palácio da Rosa
 Quinta da Regaleira
 Palácio da Bacalhoa

 Trás-os-Montes e Alto Douro 
 Palácio dos Pimentéis
 Mateus Palace
 Paço dos Távoras

 Azores and Madeira Archipelagos 
 Palácio de São Lourenço
 Palace of the Bettencourts
 Palácio de Sant'ana

 Qatar 
 Al Rayyan Palace
 Al Wukair Palace
 Markhiya Palace
 Barzan Palace
 Amiri Diwan Palace
 Umm Salal Palace
 Al Wajbah Palace
 Al Gharrafa Palace
 Al Jassasiya Palace
 Al Mirgab Palace
 Al Waab Palace

 Romania 

 Apollo Palace – Târgu Mureş
 Banffy Palace – Cluj-Napoca, built 1791.
 Baroque Palace of Oradea – founded in 1762 as the district Bishopric Palace.
 Baroque Palace, Timișoara
 Berde Palace, Cluj-Napoca
 Black eagle palace – Oradea
 Brukenthal National Museum – An 18th-century urban palazzo of Baron Brukenthal in Sibiu.
 Dauerbach Palace – Timișoara
 Dejan Palace, Timișoara
 Dicasterial Palace, Timișoara
 Dinu Mihail Palace – Craiova, today a museum.
 Finance Palace – Cluj-Napoca
 Ghica family Palace – Built in 1880, late Baroque, located in Bacău district.
 Löffler Palace, Timișoara
 Mogoșoaia Palace – Near Bucharest, founded 1698, built in Romanian Renaissance style.
 Orthodox Archiepiscopal Palace – Cluj-Napoca
 Palace of Culture (Iaşi) – built over Royal Court of Moldavia, during Carol I.
 Palace of Justice, Cluj-Napoca
 Patriarchal Palace – founded 1653, home for Romanian Orthodox heads of church. Also known as Palace of the Chamber of Deputies.
 Peleș Castle – former Sinaia summer residence of Romanian royal family.
 Pelișor Castle – On the grounds of Peleș Castle.
 Postal Palace, Cluj-Napoca
 Prefecture Palace, Cluj-Napoca
 Reduta Palace, Cluj-Napoca
 Regional Railways Palace, Cluj-Napoca
 Roznoveanu Palace – Since the 1770s, baroque palace in Iași.
 Ruginoasa Palace – small neogothic palace built in 1811, home of Sturdza family and Prince Cuza.
 Szechenyi Palace, Timișoara
 Széki Palace, Cluj-Napoca
 Urania Palace, Cluj-Napoca

 Bucharest 
 Cantacuzino Palace – Today George Enescu Museum, Bucharest.
 CEC Palace, Bucharest – palace of National Savings Bank, baroque, 1896.
 Cotroceni Palace – seat of the president, former Royal Palace, Bucharest, built for King Carol I of Romania in 1888, on a 1679 foundation.
 Creţulescu Palace – Bucharest
 Palace of Justice – founded 1890, neo-Renaissance, Bucharest.
 Palace of the Parliament, Bucharest – Absolute largest palace of the world.
 Romanian National Museum of History – founded 1894, in Bucharest, former Postal Palace, neoclassic.
 Sutu Palace – founded 1833 by Costache Sutu, today Museum of Bucharest.
 The Royal Palace – now National Museum of Art of Romania, Bucharest
 Victoria Palace – founded 1937, today seat of the Government of Romania

 Russia 
 

 Gatchina 
 Gatchina Palace
 Priory Palace

 Kaliningrad 
 Königsberg Castle (Demolished)

 Moscow 
 Catherine Palace
 Grand Kremlin Palace
 Kolomenskoye palace
 Kuskovo Palace
 Meyendorff Castle
 Ostankino Palace
 Palace of Facets
 Terem Palace
 Tsaritsyno Palace

 Oranienbaum 
 Oranienbaum Palace
 Palace of Ropsha

 Pavlovsk 
 Pavlovsk Palace
 Bip Castle

 Pella 
 Pella Palace

 Peterhof 
 Peterhof Palace

 Pushkin 
 Alexander Palace
 Catherine Palace

 Ramon 
 Ramon Palace

 Saint Petersburg 
 Alexis Palace
 Anichkov Palace
 Beloselsky-Belozersky Palace
 Constantine Palace
 Kamenny Island Palace
 Marble Palace
 Mariinsky Palace
 Menshikov Palace
 Mikhailovsky Palace
 St Michael's Castle
 New Michael Palace
 Naryshkin-Shuvalov Palace
 Nicholas Palace
 Shuvalov Palace
 Stone Island Palace
 Stroganov Palace
 Old Summer Palace
 New Summer Palace
 Tauride Palace
 Vladimir Palace
 Vorontsov Palace
 Winter Palace 
 Yelagin Palace
 Yusupov Palace

 Strelna 
 Constantine Palace

 Taganrog 
 Alferaki Palace

 Tver 
 Catherine Palace

 Yalta 
 Dulber Palace
 Massandra Palace
 Livadia Palace

 Rwanda 
 Ibwami – former royal court, Nyabisindu

 Saudi Arabia 

 Palace of Yamamah, Riyadh
 Rawdat Khuraim, Riyadh
 Ferme Janadriyah, Riyadh
 Royal State Palace, Jeddah
 Safa Palace, Mecca

 Serbia 
 Royal Compound
 White Court – one of the residences of the House of Karađorđević, Belgrade
 Old Palace – royal Palace of the Obrenović dynasty, Belgrade
 Prince Miloš's Residence
 Princess Ljubica's Residence
 Despot Stefan Tower – medieval Serbian Palace
 Palace of Serbia
 Captain Miša's Mansion

 Singapore 
 The Istana – Formerly the Government House of Singapore, Currently a seat of the president of Singapore.
 Istana Lama – A demolished house which was once belonged to the Temenggong of Johor Abdul Rahman.
 Istana Kampong Glam – A historical house which was once belonged to the Sultan of Johor Ali Iskandar Shah. Now a Malay Heritage Museum.
 Istana Bidadari – A demolished house which was once belonged to the Maharaja of Johor Abu Bakar's wife Zubaidah binti Abdullah.
 Istana Tyersall – A demolished house which was once belonged to the Sultan of Johor Abu Bakar.
 Istana Woodneuk – An abandoned house which was once belonged to the Sultan of Johor Ibrahim Al-Marhum.

 Slovakia 

 Esterházy Palace, Bratislava – home to the Slovak National Gallery
 Grassalkovich Palace, Bratislava – seat of the president
 Johann Pálffy Palace, Bratislava – home to the Bratislava City Gallery
 Mirbach Palace, Bratislava – home to the Bratislava City Gallery
 Pálffy Palace, Bratislava
 Primate's Palace, Bratislava – seat of the city government and place of the Treaty of Pressburg in 1805
 Summer Archbishop's Palace, Bratislava

 South Africa 
 Palace of Justice – the magistrates court of Pretoria
 uMgungundlovu – royal kraal of King Dingane of the Zulu Empire.

 Spain 

 Alcázar of Segovia
 Aljafería, (Zaragoza)
 Alhambra, Nasrid Palaces of La Alhambra
 Archbishop's Palace of Alcalá de Henares
 Buenavista Palace (Málaga)
 Casa de Pilatos, (Sevilla)
 Casa de las Torres
 Casa Salazar (La Laguna)
 Casa Solans, Saragossa
 Condes de Argillo Palace, (Morata de Jalón)
 Ducal Palace, (Lerma)
 El Escorial, Madrid
 Goyeneche Palace, (Nuevo Batzán)
 Liria Palace, (Madrid)
 Magalia Castle-Palace, (Las Navas del Marqués)
 Magdalena Palace, (Santander)
 Monasterio de las Descalzas Reales
 Olite Real Palace. Palace of the king of Navarre.
 Palaces and Royal Residences (Casa Real de España)
 Palacio Argensola
 Palacio de Almanzora
 Palacio de Arbaizenea
 Palacio de Ayerbe
 Palacio de la Aduana
 Palacio de Comunicaciones de Madrid
 Palace of Charles V
 Palacio de las Cigüeñas
 Palacio de los Condes de Gomara (Soria)
 Palace of the Countess of Lebrija (Sevilla)
 Palace of Condes de Cirat, (Almansa)
 Palace of las Dueñas
 Palacio de las Dueñas (Sevilla)
 Palacio Duque de Abrantes
 Palacio Episcopal de Astorga
 Palacio Episcopal de Cáceres
 Palacio de Fuenclara, (Zaragoza)
 Palacio de los Golfines de Abajo
 Palacio de los Guzmanes
 Palace of Infante don Luis, (Boadilla del Monte)
 Palace of Infantado, (Guadalajara)
 Palacio Longoria
 Palacio del Marqués de Ferrera (Avilés)
 Palacio del Maruqués de Santa Cruz, (Viso del Marques)
 Palau Reial Major, Barcelona
 Palacio Real de Aranjuez, Madrid
 Palacio Real de El Pardo, Madrid
 Palacio Real de Miramar, San Sebastián
 Palacio de la Moncloa, the residence of the Prime Minister.
 Palacio Real de La Almudaina
 Palacio Real de La Granja de San Ildefonso
 Palacio Real de Riofrío
 Palace of San Telmo, Seville
 Palace of Sobrellano, (Comillas)
 Palacio de Yanduri (Sevilla)
 Palacio de la Zarzuela – Private residence of the Monarchs of Spain
 Palau de la Generalitat de Catalunya
 Palau Güell
 Real Monasterio de La Encarnación
 Real Monasterio Santa Clara de Tordesillas
 Real Monasterio Santa María La Real de las Huelgas
 Royal Palace of Madrid – official residence of the Monarchs of Spain; and largest royal palace in Western Europe
 Royal Alcazars of Seville
 Valladolid Royal Palace

 Sri Lanka 
 Sigiriya – former royal residence & court of King Kasyapa
 Royal Palace of Kandy – last royal residence, Kingdom of Kandy

 Sweden 

 Drottningholm Palace – Private residence of the Swedish royal family, Drottningholm
 Gripsholm Castle – royal residence, Mariefred
 Palace of Bonde – former noble residence, today seat of the Supreme Court, Stockholm
 Rosendal Palace – royal residence
 Rosersberg Palace – royal residence
 Stockholm Palace (Stockholms slott) – official residence of the Swedish monarch 
 Strömsholm Palace – royal residence
 Tullgarn Palace – royal residence
 Ulriksdal Palace – royal residence
 Skoklosters slott – former noble residence, today museum

 Skåne 
The province of Skåne (Scania) in southernmost Sweden is well known for its many castles.
 Malmöhus Castle, Malmö
 Landskrona Citadel, Landskrona (includes one of the world's best preserved moat system)
 Kärnan, Helsingborg, very old tower from the 12th century
 Glimmingehus, close to Simrishamn
 Sofiero, Helsingborg, summer residence of king Gustav VI Adolf
 Trolleholm Castle, close to Eslöv
 Trollenäs Castle, also close to Eslöv
 Örenäs Castle, the youngest castle in Sweden, from 1903
 Krapperup Castle, close to Höganäs
 Svaneholm Castle
 Christinehof Castle
 Bosjökloster
 Övedskloster Castle
 Kulla Gunnarstorp Castle
 Vrams Gunnarstorp Castle
 Borgeby Castle
 Trolle-Ljungby Castle

 Syria 

 Presidential Palace, Damascus
 Tishreen Palace, Damascus
 Azm Palace, Damascus
 Azm Palace, Hama
 Qasr al-Hayr al-Gharbi
 Qasr al-Hayr al-Sharqi
 Royal Palace of Mari
 Royal Palace of Ugarit

 Taiwan 

 Fort Zeelandia – former residence for Governor of Dutch Formosa and Prince of Yanping under the Kingdom of Tungning, Tainan.
 Fort San Domingo and Fort San Salvador – Governor of Spanish Formosa.
 Qing Dynasty Taiwan Provincial Administration Hall – former site of the Qing dynasty government yamen that ruled Taiwan.
 Presidential Office Building, Taipei – originally built as the Office of the Governor-General of Taiwan during the period of Japanese rule
 Taipei Guest House – former Governor-General of Taiwan's Residence
 Shilin Official Residence – residence of President Chiang Kai-shek
 Seven Seas Residence – residence of President Chiang Ching-kuo
 Official Residence of the President of the Republic of China – de facto official residence since President Lee Teng-hui

 Thailand 

 Ancient Grand Palace (พระราชวังโบราณ) – Former Main Palace of the Ayutthaya Kingdom, Ayutthaya
 Baan Puen Palace (พระรามราชนิเวศน์) – Phetchaburi
 Bang Pa-In Royal Palace (พระราชวังบางปะอิน) – Summer Palace, Ayutthaya
 Bang Khun Phrom Palace (วังบางขุนพรหม) – currently, as the Bank of Thailand, Bangkok
 Bhuban Palace (พระตำหนักภูพานราชนิเวศน์) – royal residence, Sakon Nakhon Province
 Bhubing Palace (พระตำหนักภูพิงราชนิเวศน์) – royal residence, Chiang Mai
 Burapha Phirom Palace (วังบูรพาภิรมย์) – currently, as a market, Bangkok
 Chakrabongse Palace (วังจักรพงษ์) – currently, as a private resort, Bangkok
 Chakri Bongkot Palace (พระตำหนักจักรีบงกช) – Private residence of the Thai royal family, Bangkok
 Chankasem Palace (วังจันทรเกษม)
 Derm Palace (พระราชวังเดิม) or Thon Buri Palace – It was the palace of King Taksin, now used as HQ of Royal Thai Navy
 Doi Tung Palace (พระตำหนักดอยตุง) – royal residence, Chiang Rai
 Dusit Palace (พระราชวังดุสิต) – Private residence of the Thai royal family, Bangkok
 Chitralada Palace (พระตำหนักจิตรลดารโหฐาน) (New Palace) – Private residence of the Thai royal family, Bangkok
 Vimanmek Palace (พระที่นั่งวิมานเมฆ) (Vimanmek Mansion) – former royal residence, Bangkok
 Front Palace (พระราชวังบวรสถานมงคล) – currently, as Bangkok National Museum, Bangkok
 Grand Palace, Bangkok (พระบรมมหาราชวัง) – official residence of the King of Thailand, Bangkok
 Kham Yat Palace - (พระตำหนักคำหยาด) residence of King Boromakot of Ayutthaya ( 1733-1758)
 King Narai's Palace (พระนารายณ์ราชนิเวศน์) – Lopburi
 Klai Kangwon Palace (วังไกลกังวล) – royal residence, King Rama IX likes there, Hua Hin
 Le Dix Palace (พระตำหนักเลอดิศ) – Private residence of the Thai royal family, Bangkok
 Marukatayawan Summer Palace (พระราชนิเวศน์มฤคทายวัน) – Phetchaburi
 Nakorn Luang Palace (ปราสาทนครหลวง) – Nakorn Luang, Ayutthaya
 Nonthaburi Palace (พระตำหนักนนทบุรี) – former private residence of the Thai royal family, Bangkok
 Phanakornkiri Palace (พระราชวังพระนครคีรี) – Phetchaburi
 Phetchabun Palace (วังเพ็ชรบูรณ์) – currently, as CentralWorld, Bangkok
 Phya Thai Palace (พระราชวังพญาไท) – Bangkok
 Rear Palace (พระราชวังบวรสถานพิมุข) – It is now a part of Siriraj Hospital, Bangkok
 Sanamchan Palace (พระราชวังสนามจันทร์) – King Rama VI's Palace, Nakhon Pathom
 Saranrom Palace (พระราชวังสราญรมย์) – currently, as a Saranrom Park, Bangkok
 Siriyalai Palace (พระตำหนักสิริยาลัย) – private residence of the Thai royal family, Ayutthaya
 Sa Pathum Palace (วังสระปทุม) – private residence of the Thai royal family, Bangkok
 Suan Pakard Palace (วังสวนผักกาด) – currently, as a museum, Bangkok
 Sukhothai Palace (วังศุโขทัย) – Private residence of the Thai royal family, Bangkok
 Taksin Palace (พระตำหนักทักษิณราชนิเวศน์) – royal residence, Narathiwat Province
 Thapra Palace (วังท่าพระ) – currently, as a university, Bangkok
 Tuk Palace – Ayutthaya Palace, Ayutthaya
 Waradit Palace (วังวรดิศ) – currently, as a museum, Bangkok

 Tonga 
 Royal Palace, Tonga-Royal Palace of the Kingdom of Tonga is located in the northwest of the capital, Nukuʻalofa, close to the Pacific Ocean.

 Tunisia 
 Abdellia Palace

 Turkey 

In Turkish, a palace is a Saray.
 Adile Sultan Palace – former royal residence
 Aynalıkavak Palace – former royal summer residence
 Beylerbeyi Palace – former royal residence
 Çırağan Palace – former royal residence, today hotel
 Dolmabahçe Palace – former residence of the Ottoman Royal Family, today state-guest house
 Edirne Palace – former royal residence
 Feriye Palace – former royal residence
 Hatice Sultan Palace – former residence of Hatice Sultan
 Ihlamur Palace – former royal summer residence
 İbrahim Paşa Palace – former royal residence
 Khedive Palace – former royal summer residence
 Küçüksu Palace – former royal summer residence
 Maslak Palace – former royal summer residence
 Presidential Complex – one of the largest palaces in the world
 Tophane Palace – former royal residence
 Topkapı Palace – former residence of the Ottoman sultans
 Yıldız Palace – former royal residence
 Atik Pasha Palace - 19th century late Ottoman palace, former residence of the Admiral Atik Pasha, now part of the Four Seasons Hotel.

 Turkmenistan 
 Rukhiyet Palace
 Türkmenbaşı Palace

 Ukraine 

 Kyiv
 Klovsky Palace
 Mariinskyi Palace – residence of the president of Ukraine
 Crimea
 Alupka Palace
 Bakhchisaray Palace
 Livadia Palace
 Massandra
 Yusupov Palace
 Dnipro
 Potemkin's Palace
 Lviv
 Royal Palace, Lviv
 Lubomirski Palace, Lviv
 Potocki Palace, Lviv
 Sapieha Palace, Lviv
 Metropolitan Palace, Lviv
 Palazzo Bandinelli
 Lubomirski Palace in Dubno
 Pidhirtsi Palace
 Razumovsky Palace in Baturyn
 Kachanivka Palace
 Schönborn Palace in Chynadiievo
 Vorontsov Palace in Odessa
 Zolochiv Palace
 Zhovkva Palace

 United Arab Emirates 
 Abu Dhabi
 Qasr Al Watan
 Qasr Al Bateen
 Qasr Al Musharif
 Dubai
 Zabeel Palace
 Nad Al Sheba Palace
 Sharjah
 Qasr Al Badi'a
 Ajman
 Qasr Al Zaher
 Umm al Qaywayn
 Qasr Al Madar
 Ras al Khaimah
 Qasr Al Dhait
 Fujairah
 Sheikh Palace

 United Kingdom 

 England 

 Official royal residences in London:
 Bridewell Palace – a royal residence from 1515 until 1523, now demolished
 Buckingham Palace – the monarch's official London residence since 1837
 Bushy House – future William IV took up residence here in 1797 when appointed Ranger of Bushy Park, and remained through his reign as king (1830–1837) rather than moving to St. James or (later) Buckingham
 Clarence House – a royal residence since 1830 – part of St. James's Palace, currently the residence of The Prince of Wales
 Eltham Palace – a royal residence from 1305 until 1649. Rebuilt as a house after falling into ruin, it was later used by the Army and is now a museum
 Hampton Court Palace – a royal residence from 1529 until 1760. Now a museum
 Kensington Palace – a royal residence since 1689 (but not used by a reigning monarch since 1797)
 Kew Palace – a royal residence from 1728 until 1818. Now a museum
 Palace of Placentia – Also known as Greenwich Palace, a royal residence from 1447 until 1660, when it was demolished
 Richmond Palace – a royal residence from 1497 until 1649, now ruined
 St. James's Palace – the monarch's official London residence from 1702 until 1837. Ambassadors are still accredited to the Court of St. James's and several members of the Royal family still maintain apartments there, e.g., Princess Alexandra and The Princess Royal.
 Tower of London – a royal residence from the 12th century until the 17th century. Now a museum
 Palace of Whitehall – the monarch's official London residence from 1530 until 1698, now demolished
 Palace of Westminster – the monarch's official London residence from 1049 until 1530. Now the home of the British Parliament
 Other royal residences:
 Palace of Beaulieu – a royal residence from 1515 until 1573
 Nonsuch Palace – a royal residence from 1538 until 1683, when it was demolished
 Osborne House – a royal residence from 1851 until 1902. Now a museum
 Windsor Castle – the monarch's other official residence
 Other palaces:
 Addington Palace – former home of the Archbishops of Canterbury
 Apethorpe Palace
 Basildon Park
 Bishopthorpe Palace – seat of the Archbishop of York
 Blenheim Palace – seat of the Duke of Marlborough
 Castle Howard – seat of the Earl of Carlisle
 Chatsworth House – seat of the Duke of Devonshire
 Fulham Palace – former seat of the Bishop of London
 Harewood House – seat of the Earl of Harewood
 Highclere Castle – seat of the Earl of Carnarvon
 Holkham Hall – seat of the Earl of Leicester
 Lambeth Palace – seat of the Archbishop of Canterbury
 Nottingham Castle
 Syon House – home of the Duke of Northumberland
 Wentworth Woodhouse – former seat of the Marquess of Rockingham
 Wilton House – seat of the Earl of Pembroke
 Winchester Palace – former seat of the Bishop of Winchester
 Woburn Abbey – seat of the Duke of Bedford

 Scotland 

 Dalkeith Palace – former seat of the Duke of Buccleuch
 Dunfermline Palace – former palace of the Scottish monarchs
 Edinburgh Castle – former palace of the Scottish monarchs
 Falkland Palace – former palace of the Scottish monarchs
 Hamilton Palace – former seat of the Duke of Hamilton
 Linlithgow Palace – former palace of the Scottish monarchs
 Palace of Holyroodhouse – official residence of the Scottish monarchs and the British monarchs in Scotland since 1503
 Scone Palace – seat of the Earl of Mansfield
 Seton Palace – former seat of the Earl of Winton
 Spynie Palace – former seat of the Bishop of Moray

 United States 

 Colorado 
 Cliff Palace – ruins from a dwelling of the Ancient Pueblo People

 District of Columbia 
 White House – official residence of the president of the United States.
 Number One Observatory Circle – official residence of the vice president of the United States.

 Florida 

 Government House (St. Augustine) – official residence of the governors of La Florida, a territory of the Viceroyalty of New Spain, as well as the British colony of East Florida.

 Guam 

 Plaza de España - the site of the palace of the Spanish Governors of Guam. The palace itself was largely destroyed during the liberation of Guam however many outlying structures still stand and there are plans to possibly reconstruct the palace in the future.

 Hawaii 

 Āinahau – royal estate of Princess Victoria Kaiulani
 Brick Palace – first Western style building in Hawaii, commissioned by Kamehameha I for his wife Queen Kaahumanu in Lahaina, and the islands first brick structure
 Haleākala – royal estate of High Chief Pākī, the former grass hut complex on the same site was known as Aikupika
 Hamohamo – royal residence of Queen Lili'uokalani at Waikiki
 Hanaiakamalama – royal residence of Queen Emma
 Halekamani – royal residence of Princess Nāhienaena in Lahaina, later sold to Gorham D. Gilman
 Haliʻimaile – royal residence of Princess Victoria Kamāmalu and her brother Prince Lot Kapuāiwa until he succeed as Kamehameha V, in Honolulu, on the corner of King and Richards streets
 Helumoa – royal residence of Kamehameha V at Waikiki amongst the coconut groves
 Hulihee Palace – royal residence of Princess Ruth and later King Kalakaua
 Iolani Palace' – royal palace, 1882–1893, Honolulu; only official palace in the United States other than the White House
 Kaniakapupu – royal residence of Kamehameha III and Queen Kalama
 Keōua Hale – royal residence of Princess Ruth
 Kīnau Hale – wooden bungalow of Queen Emma's uncle (either James Kanehoa or Keoni Ana); located near Iolani Palace, it served as the chamberlain's residence in Kamehameha V's reign and was the place where Kalakaua was inaugurated as King of Hawaii.
 Marine Residence – royal residence of Lunalilo at Waikiki, where he died, willed to Queen Emma.
 Mauna Kilohana – royal estate of Queen Emma in Lāwaʻi, Kauaʻi inherited from her uncle Keoni Ana.
 Muolaulani – royal residence of Queen Lili'uokalani at Kapâlama, now the site of Lili`uokalani Children's Center
 Paoakalani – royal residence of Queen Lili'uokalani at Waikiki, willed to her by her grandfather ʻAikanaka
 Pualeilani – royal residence of King Kalakaua, Queen Kapiolani and finally Prince Kuhio, who willed it to the City of Honolulu; the property Uluniu was purchased by the king from Princess Keelikolani in 1880 for $400
 Kealohilani – royal residence of Queen Lili'uokalani at Waikiki, willed to her by her grandfather ʻAikanaka; she composed most of her works in this house
 Rooke House – Private residences of Queen Emma; her childhood home
 Ululani – royal residence of Victoria Kinoiki Kekaulike on Beretania Street, became the site of the Kapiolani Medical Center for Women and Children
 Waipio Palace – royal grasshut palace of the ancient kings of Hawaii (island), most significant for the four nioi tree columns which supported it, according to oral traditions; later destroyed by the King Kahekili II of Maui
 Wānanakoa – Private residence of Bernice Pauahi Bishop and Charles Reed Bishop at the beginning of their marriage; it was a small cottage located in the Nuuanu Valley where the Royal Mausoleum of Hawaii stands now
 Washington Place – royal residence of Queen Lili'uokalani

 New Jersey 
 Proprietary House – Home of both the Proprietary Governors of New Jersey from 1766 to 1773 and the Royal Governor of New Jersey, William Franklin from 1774 to 1776.

 New Mexico 

 Palace of the Governors – Oldest continuously occupied public building in the United States. Originally built as a home for the governors of Santa Fe de Nuevo México, a province of the Viceroyalty of New Spain and later, a territory of Mexico.

 North Carolina 
 Tryon Palace – Royal seat of British colonial rule in the Province of North Carolina.
 Biltmore Estate – Home of George Washington Vanderbilt II and largest house in the United States.

 Pennsylvania 
 Pennsbury Manor – Home of William Penn as Proprietor of Pennsylvania from 1683 to 1701.

 Puerto Rico 
 Palacio de Santa Catalina – Also known as La Fortaleza

 Texas 

 Bishop's Palace, Galveston – former residence of the Bishops of the Roman Catholic Archdiocese of Galveston-Houston. Recognized as one of the top fourteen finest examples of Victorian architecture in the United States.

 Spanish Governor's Palace – official residence of the governors of Tejas, a territory of the Viceroyalty of New Spain. Located in San Antonio, it is considered the sole remaining example of an aristocratic early Spanish house in Texas.

 Virginia 
 Governor's Palace – Royal seat of British colonial rule in the Colony of Virginia.

 Vatican City 
 Apostolic Palace – residence of the Pope
 Lateran Palace – seat of the Bishop of Rome

 Venezuela 
 Palacio de Miraflores – seat of the president of Venezuela, Caracas

 Vietnam 
 Imperial Palace (The Forbidden Purple City) – former Seat of the Emperors of Vietnam, Huế
 Presidential Palace in Hanoi
 Reunification Palace
 Cổ Loa Citadel
 Gia Long Palace
 Thang Long Imperial City 
 Tây Đô castle

 List of non-residential palaces 

Some large impressive buildings which were not meant to be residences, but are nonetheless called palaces, include:
 Alexandra Palace (England)
 Legislative Palace of San Lazaro, Mexico City – official Seat of the bicameral Honorable Mexican Congress of the Union (Senate and Chamber of Deputies), but ordinary seat of the Chamber of Deputies
 Palace of the Legislative Assembly of the Federal District, Mexico City – seat of the Legislative Assembly of the Federal District
 Palace of the Parliament, Bucharest:  2nd largest building in world (by floorspace)
 Palacio de Bellas Artes, Mexico City – National house of the arts and culture in Mexico, former legislative palace.
 Palacio de Correos de Mexico, Mexico City – Serves as the mail centre of Mexico City and Mexico itself
 Palacio de Comunicaciones de Madrid (Spain)
 Palast der Republik (Germany)
 Palau de la Música Catalana (Spain)
 Peace Palace (The Netherlands)
 The Crystal Palace (England)
 Galeria degli Uffizi (Italy)
 Victoria Palace – seat of the Prime Minister, Bucharest
 Palace of Justice in Antwerp (former)
 Palace of Justice in Antwerp (recent)
 Palace of Justice in Brussels
 Palace of facets (Russia)
 Priory Palace (Russia)
 Soviet-era Palaces of Culture (Russia)
 The People's Palace (Scotland)
 Palace of Justice, (Malaysia)

Note, too, the French use of the word palais in such constructions as palais des congrès (convention centre) and palais de justice'' (courthouse).

See also 
 List of royal palaces
 World's largest palace
 List of castles
 List of forts
 List of mausoleums
 Official residence

References 

Lists of buildings and structures

Lists by country
Lists of royal residences